This is a list of notable current and former faculty members, alumni (graduating and non-graduating) of Vanderbilt University in Nashville, Tennessee.

Unless otherwise noted, attendees listed graduated with a bachelor's degree. Names with an asterisk (*) graduated from Peabody College prior to its merger with Vanderbilt.

Notable alumni

Academia

Presidents and chancellors
 Bob Agee (Ph.D.) – 13th president of Oklahoma Baptist University
 Will W. Alexander (B.Th. 1912) – founding president of Dillard University
 Niels-Erik Andreasen (Ph.D. 1971) – 5th president of Andrews University
 Roslyn Clark Artis (Ed.D. 2010) – 14th president of Benedict College
 Robert G. Bottoms (Ph.D. 1972) – 18th president of DePauw University
 William Leroy Broun – 4th president of Auburn University
 Robert Bruininks (M.A. 1965, Ph.D. 1968) – 15th president of the University of Minnesota
 Doak S. Campbell* (M.A. 1928, Ph.D. 1930) – 1st president of Florida State University
 Shirley Collado (B.A. 1994) – 9th president of Ithaca College
 James C. Conwell (Ph.D. 1989) – 15th president of the Rose-Hulman Institute of Technology
 Dennis Hargrove Cooke* (Ph.D. 1930) – 4th president of East Carolina University
 Jesse Lee Cuninggim – 1st president of Scarritt College
 Merrimon Cuninggim (B.A. 1931) – 15th president of Salem College
 Herman Lee Donovan* (Ph.D. 1928) – 4th president of the University of Kentucky
 Sheldon Hackney (B.A. 1955) –  6th president of the University of Pennsylvania; chairman, National Endowment for the Humanities
 Thomas K. Hearn (Ph.D. 1965) – 12th president of Wake Forest University
 E. Bruce Heilman (B.S. 1951, M.A. 1952) – 5th chancellor of the University of Richmond
 Alfred Hume (Ph.D. 1887) – 10th chancellor of the University of Mississippi
 Z. T. Johnson* (Ph.D. 1929) – 8th president of Asbury University
 David C. Joyce (Ed.D. 1995) – 13th president of Brevard College
 Robert L. King (J.D. 1971) – 7th chancellor of the State University of New York
 Bradford Knapp (B.A. 1892) – 8th president of Auburn University
 John Lowden Knight (M.A.) – 10th president of Nebraska Wesleyan University, 4th president of Baldwin-Wallace College
 Michael K. Le Roy (Ph.D. 1994) – 10th president of Calvin College
 J. Bernard Machen (B.A. 1966) – 16th president of University of Utah, 11th president of University of Florida
  The Rev. Edward Malloy (Ph.D. 1975) – 16th president of the University of Notre Dame
 Howard Justus McGinnis* (Ph.D. 1927) – 3rd president of East Carolina University
 Edward C. Merrill Jr. (Ph.D. 1954)* – 4th president of Gallaudet University
 Scott D. Miller (Ed.D. 1988) – 4th president of Virginia Wesleyan University
 Charles N. Millican* (M.A. 1946) – founding president of the University of Central Florida
 Niel Nielson (M.A., Ph.D.) – 5th president of Covenant College
 Fred Tom Mitchell* (M.A. 1927) – 10th president of Mississippi State University
 Maryly Van Leer Peck (B.E. 1951) – 2nd president of Polk State College
 J. Matthew Pinson (Ed.D.) – 5th president of Welch College
 Griffith Thompson Pugh Sr. (Ph.D. 1905) – former president of Columbia College
 Edwin Richardson (B.S. 1900)* – 9th president of Louisiana Tech University
 Kevin M. Ross (Ph.D. 2006) – 5th president of Lynn University
 Rubel Shelly (M.A., Ph.D.) – 8th president of Rochester College
 Henry N. Snyder (B.A. 1887) – 4th president of Wofford College
 John J. Tigert (B.A. 1904) – Rhodes Scholar, 3rd president of University of Florida, 7th U.S. Commissioner of Education
 William Troutt (Ph.D. 1978) – 19th president of Rhodes College
 Richard L. Wallace (Ph.D. 1965) – 20th president of the University of Missouri
 Toshimasa Yasukata (Ph.D. 1985) – president of Hokkai Gakuen University
 M. Norvel Young (M.A., Ph.D. 1937) – 3rd president of Pepperdine University
 James Fulton Zimmerman (B.A., M.A.) – 7th president of the University of New Mexico

Professors and scholars
 Ali Abdullah Al-Daffa (Ph.D. 1972) – Saudi mathematician; scholar at King Fahd University, King Saud University, Harvard University; founding fellow, Islamic Academy of Sciences
 Erik K. Alexander – professor of medicine, Harvard Medical School; co-chairman, International Guidelines on Thyroid Disease & Pregnancy
 Robert Arrington (B.A. 1960) – American philosopher, Woodrow Wilson Fellow, Oxford Fellow
 John Arthur (Ph.D. 1973) – philosopher, professor at Binghamton University, Harvard University, fellow at the University of Oxford
 Martha Bailey (Ph.D. 2005) – professor of economics at UCLA, executive board of the American Economic Association
 Jeff Balser (M.D./Ph.D. 1990) – president and CEO of Vanderbilt University Medical Center and dean of the Vanderbilt University School of Medicine
 Faisal Basri (M.A. 1988) – Indonesian economist specializing in political economics
 Randolph Blake (Ph.D. 1972) – Centennial Professor of Psychology at Vanderbilt, former faculty at Northwestern University and Seoul National University, National Academy of Sciences
 Dan Blazer (B.A. 1965) – J.P. Gibbons Professor of Psychiatry emeritus at Duke University School of Medicine
 Cleanth Brooks (B.A. 1928) – literary critic and professor of English at Yale University
 L. Carl Brown (B.A. 1950) – emeritus professor of history at Princeton University, Guggenheim Fellow
 Markus Brunnermeier (M.A. 1994) – economist, Edwards S. Sanford professorship at Princeton University, Guggenheim Fellow
 Anthea Butler (M.A., Ph.D. 2001) – Geraldine R. Segal Professor in American Social Thought at the University of Pennsylvania
 Sheryll Cashin (B.E. 1984) – law scholar, political adviser, professor at Georgetown University Law Center
 Kathleen R. Cho (M.D. 1984) – professor of pathology and internal medicine at Michigan Medicine, National Academy of Medicine
 Ellen Cohn (M.S. 1975) – Associate Dean and professor at University of Pittsburgh School of Health and Rehabilitation Sciences
 Ed Connor (M.S. 1982) – key figure in the neuroscience of object synthesis in higher-level visual cortex, professor of neuroscience at Johns Hopkins University
 Herman Daly (Ph.D.) – ecological and Georgist economist, developed the Index of Sustainable Economic Welfare, Right Livelihood Award winner
 John Emmeus Davis (B.A. 1971) – scholar who has advanced the understanding of community land trusts, taught at Tufts University and the Massachusetts Institute of Technology
 Tania Douglas (M.S. 1995) – professor of biomedical engineering, Research Chair of Biomedical Engineering and Innovation at the University of Cape Town, Quartz Africa Innovators (2018)
 Larry Druffel (Ph.D. 1975) – director emeritus and visiting scientist at the Software Engineering Institute (SEI) at Carnegie Mellon University, Fellow of the IEEE
 William Yandell Elliott (B.A. 1917, M.A. 1920) – Rhodes Scholar, professor of history at University of California, Berkeley and Harvard University
 Sarah K. England (Postdoc) – Alan A. and Edith L. Wolff Professor of Obstetrics and Gynaecology at Washington University in St. Louis, Robert Wood Johnson Foundation Fellow
 George T. Flom (M.A. 1894) – professor of linguistics and author of numerous reference books, knighted by 1 Class of the Royal Norwegian Order of St. Olav (1939)
 Kenneth Galloway (B.A. 1962) – American engineer, distinguished professor of engineering, dean of the School of Engineering, emeritus, Vanderbilt University
 John Gaventa,  (B.A. 1971) – sociologist, Rhodes Scholar, MacArthur Fellow (1981), Officer of the Order of the British Empire
 Cullen B. Gosnell (M.A. 1920), founder and former chair of the department of political science at Emory University
 Antonio Gotto (B.A. 1957, M.D. 1965) – dean of Cornell University Weill Medical College, Rhodes Scholar
 Edward C. Green – American medical anthropologist, Presidential Advisory Council on HIV/AIDS, Senior Research Scientist at the Harvard School of Public Health
 Roger Groot (B.A. 1963) – Class of 1975 Alumni Professor of Law at Washington and Lee University School of Law, expert in criminal law and the death penalty
 F. Peter Guengerich (Ph.D. 1973) – Tadashi Inagami Chair in Biochemistry at the Vanderbilt University School of Medicine
 Herbert Gursky (M.S. 1953) – superintendent, NRL's Space Science Div., chief scientist, Hulburt Center for Space Research, professor of physics and astronomy at Harvard, Princeton, and Columbia University
 J. Alex Haller (B.A. 1947) – first Robert Garrett Professor of Pediatric Surgery at the Johns Hopkins School of Medicine, co-creator and namesake of the Haller index
 Helen Hardacre (B.A. 1971, M.A. 1972) – Reischauer Institute Professor of Japanese Religions and Society, Harvard University; Guggenheim Fellow; Order of the Rising Sun, Japan (2018)
 Louis R. Harlan (M.S. 1948) – academic historian, winner of the 1984 Pulitzer Prize for Biography or Autobiography
 David Edwin Harrell (Ph.D. 1962) – historian at Auburn University, emeritus professor and Breeden Eminent Scholar of Southern History
 John Heil (Ph.D.) – professor of philosophy at the Washington University in St Louis, Guggenheim Fellow (2018)
 Alfred O. Hero Jr. (M.A. 1950) – American political scientist; editor, International Organization; visiting professor, University of Toronto; visiting scholar, Harvard University
 Dorothy M. Horstmann (med. resident) – epidemiologist and virologist whose research helped set the stage for the polio vaccine, first female professor of the Yale School of Medicine
 Kung Hsiang-fu (Ph.D. 1969) – Chinese geneticist and oncologist, former director of the University of Hong Kong's Institute of Molecular Biology, Chinese Academy of Sciences
 G. Scott Hubbard (B.S. 1970) – former director of NASA's Ames Research Center, chairman SpaceX Safety Advisory Panel, adjunct professor Stanford University
 Paul Hudak (B.S. 1973) – professor and chair of the department of computer science, Yale University, best known for his involvement in the design of the Haskell programming language
 Richard Hurd (Ph.D.) – professor of industrial and labor relations; ILR associate dean for external relations, Cornell University School of Industrial and Labor Relations
 Mainul Islam (Ph.D. 1981) – Bangladeshi economist and academician, awarded Ekushey Padak by the Government of Bangladesh in 2018
 George Pullen Jackson (B.A. 1902) – professor of German at Vanderbilt University
 Alexander D. Johnson (B.A. 1974) – professor and vice chair of the department of microbiology and immunology at the University of California, San Francisco
 Joseph A. Kéchichian – Lebanese author and political scientist, Hoover Fellow at Stanford University, former lecturer at the University of California in Los Angeles
 Edwin A. Keeble (B.E. 1924) – American architect trained in the Beaux-Arts tradition, known for tall slender church steeples, nicknamed "Keeble's needles," taught at the University of Pennsylvania
 David Kirk (B.A. 1996) – sociologist; associate professor of sociology, University of Oxford; departmental director of research
 J. Davy Kirkpatrick (B.S. 1986) – American astronomer at the Infrared Processing and Analysis Center at the California Institute of Technology whose research was named one of the Top 100 Stories of 2011 by Discover Magazine
 Thomas Kolditz (B.A. 1978) –  former director, Leader Development Program at the Yale School of Management; founding director, Doerr Institute at Rice University
 Leah Krubitzer (Ph.D. 1989) – professor of psychology at University of California, Davis, and head of the Laboratory of Evolutionary Neurobiology, MacArthur Fellow (1998)
 Frances E. Lee (Ph.D. 1997) – professor of politics and public affairs, Princeton University; co-editor of Legislative Studies Quarterly
 Peter Mancina (Ph.D. 2016) – research associate at the Centre for Criminology, Law Faculty of the University of Oxford
 Tom Maniatis (Ph.D. 1971) – professor of molecular and cellular biology, held faculty positions at Harvard University, the California Institute of Technology, and Columbia University, Lasker Award winner (2001)
 Henry Manne (B.A. 1950) – American writer and academic, considered a founder of the law and economics discipline
 Jacques Marcovitch (M.M. 1972) – Brazilian emeritus professor at the Business Administration, Economy and Accountancy Faculty, University of São Paulo
 Donald B. McCormick (B.S. 1953, Ph.D. 1958) – biochemist; professor, Cornell University; chair of biochemistry, Emory University; Guggenheim Fellow
 Glenn McGee (M.A. 1991, Ph.D. 1994) – bioethicist; founding editor of the American Journal of Bioethics; associate director of UPenn Bioethics, 1995–2005
 Timothy J. McGrew (M.A. 1991, Ph.D. 1992) – professor of philosophy, and chair of the department of philosophy at Western Michigan University
 Neil R. McMillen (Ph.D. 1969) – professor emeritus at the University of Southern Mississippi, Bancroft Prize winner (1990), Pulitzer Prize finalist (1990)
 H. Houston Merritt (B.S. 1922) – former Harvard University faculty, former dean of the Vagelos College of Physicians and Surgeons at Columbia University
 Edwin Mims (B.A. 1892, M.A. 1893) – chair of the Vanderbilt University English Department (1912–1942), taught many members of the Fugitives and the Southern Agrarians
 Merrill Moore (B.A. 1924) – Ericksonian psychologist, poet, taught neurology at Harvard Medical School, research fellow of the Harvard Psychological Clinic
 David Morton (B.A. 1909) – American poet, Golden Rose Award winner, faculty at Amherst College
 Pieter Mosterman (Ph.D. 1997) – chief research scientist, director of the MathWorks Advanced Research & Technology Office (MARTO), adjunct professor at McGill University
 Michael Ndurumo (B.S., M.S., Ph.D.) – Kenyan Professor of Psychology at the University of Nairobi, Kenya, activist for special education in Africa
 Mark Noll (Ph.D. 1975) – historian, research professor of history at Regent College, previously Francis A. McAnaney Professor of History at the University of Notre Dame
 Michael O'Brien – British historian, professor of American Intellectual History at the University of Cambridge
 Efosa Ojomo (B.E. 2005) – Global Prosperity Lead, Clayton Christensen Institute, senior research fellow, Harvard Business School
 Kit Parker (Ph.D. 1998) – Tarr Family Professor of Bioengineering and Applied Physics at Harvard University, research includes tissue engineering, traumatic brain injury, micro- and nanotechnologies
 Monica E. Peek (B.S. 1991) – Ellen H. Block Professor for Health Justice at the Pritzker School of Medicine, University of Chicago
 Don K. Price (B.A. 1931) – founding dean of Harvard University's John F. Kennedy School of Government (1958–1976), Rhodes Scholar
 Bill Purcell (J.D. 1979) – former director of the Institute of Politics (IOP) at Harvard University's John F. Kennedy School of Government
 Stuart C. Ray (M.D. 1990) – vice chair of medicine for data integrity and analytics, associate director of the Infectious Diseases Fellowship Training Program at the Johns Hopkins School of Medicine
 J. Fred Rippy (M.A. 1915) – historian of Latin American and American diplomacy, professor of history at the University of Chicago and Duke University, Guggenheim Fellow
 Marylyn D. Ritchie (M.S. 2002, Ph.D. 2004) – professor of genetics; director, Center for Translational Bioinformatics at the University of Pennsylvania
 Tom Rockmore (Ph.D. 1974) – distinguished humanities chair, professor at Peking University, China
 Leland Sage (B.A. 1922) – American historian, professor emeritus of history at the University of Northern Iowa
 Elyn Saks (B.A. 1977) – associate dean and professor of law at the University of Southern California; scholar of mental health law; MacArthur Fellow (2009)
 Roberto Castillo Sandoval (M.A. 1985) – Chilean author and professor of comparative literature and Latin American studies at Haverford College
 Edward Schumacher-Matos (B.A. 1968) – director, Edward R. Murrow Center, Tufts University, former faculty, Columbia University School of Journalism, former director, migration studies, Harvard University
 James K. Sebenius (B.A. 1975) – American economist, Gordon Donaldson Professor of Business administration at Harvard Business School
 Artyom Shneyerov (M.A. 1997) – microeconomist at Concordia University in Montreal, Quebec, Canada
 Debora Shuger (B.A. 1975, M.A. 1978, M.A.T. 1978) – distinguished professor of English at UCLA, contributor to the Cambridge History of Early Modern English Literature, Guggenheim Fellow
 Lee Sigelman (Ph.D. 1973), American political scientist, former editor-in-chief of the American Political Science Review
 Evgenia Smirni (Ph.D. 1995) – Sidney P. Chockley Professor of Computer Science at the College of William & Mary, IEEE Fellow
 D.M. Smith (B.A. 1908, M.A. 1910) – mathematician and professor at the Georgia Institute of Technology, charter member of the American Mathematical Society
 James Perrin Smith (M.A. 1887) – early scholar of Mesozoic rock formations, professor of geology and paleontology at Stanford University, Mary Clark Thompson Medal winner, National Academy of Sciences
 Erica Spatz (B.S. 1997) – associate professor, clinical investigator at the Center for Outcomes Research and Evaluation, Yale University School of Medicine
 Mildred T. Stahlman (B.A. 1943, M.D. 1946) – professor of pediatrics and pathology at Vanderbilt, started the first newborn intensive care unit in the world, John Howland Award winner
 David Stuart (Ph.D. 1995) – archaeologist/epigrapher, MacArthur Fellow at age 18, former curator of Maya Hieroglyphs and senior lecturer at Harvard University, Schele Professor of Mesoamerican Art and Writing at UT Austin
 John J. Stuhr (M.A., Ph.D. 1976) – distinguished professor of philosophy and American studies at Emory University, coined genealogical pragmatism
 Mriganka Sur (M.S. 1975, Ph.D. 1978) – Newton Professor of Neuroscience, Simons Center for the Social Brain Director, investigator at the Picower Institute for Learning and Memory at MIT
 James R. Thompson (B.S. 1960) – former chair of the department of statistics and Noah Harding Emeritus Professor of Statistics at Rice University
 Antonio D. Tillis (B.S. 1987) – dean, College of Charleston; chair, Latin American studies, Purdue University; chair, African and African-American studies, Dartmouth College
 Richard D. Todd (B.S.) – former Blanche F. Ittleson Professor of Psychiatry and director, child and adolescent psychiatry at Washington University in St. Louis
 Victor J. Torres (Ph.D. 2004) – C.V. Starr Professor of Microbiology, New York University School of Medicine; director, Anti-Microbial Resistant Pathogens Program; MacArthur Fellow (2021)
 Thomas J. Trebat (Ph.D.) – American economist and political scientist who teaches at the School of International and Public Affairs at Columbia University, member of the Council on Foreign Relations
 James C. Tsai (M.B.A. 1998) – former Robert R. Young Professor of Ophthalmology and Visual Science and chair, Department of Ophthalmology, Yale University School of Medicine
 David Tzuriel (Ph.D. 1977) – Israeli psychologist, professor and chairman of the School of Education at Bar Ilan University
 Richard M. Weaver (M.A. 1934) – Platonist philosopher, author, scholar, and authority on modern rhetoric, professor of English at the University of Chicago
 Emil Carl Wilm (M.A. 1903) – Prussian-American philosopher, professor at Washburn College, Harvard University, Boston University, and Stanford University
 John Long Wilson (B.A. 1935) – medical professor and administrator at American University of Beirut, Lebanon, and Stanford University
 Sheldon M. Wolff (M.D. 1957) – former chair of the department of medicine at Tufts University School of Medicine
 Minky Worden (B.A. 1989) – human rights advocate and author, director of Global Initiatives at Human Rights Watch, professor at Columbia University's School of International and Social Affairs
 Thomas Daniel Young (Ph.D. 1950) – first Gertrude C. Vanderbilt Professor of English at Vanderbilt

Art, literature, and humanities 
 Alev Alatlı (M.A. 1965) – Turkish economist, philosopher, columnist and bestselling novelist
 Thomas B. Allen – American expressionist painter and illustrator, pioneer of visual journalism
 Alfred Bartles – composer of "Music for Symphony Orchestra and Jazz Ensemble"
 Richmond C. Beatty (M.A. 1928, Ph.D. 1930) – biographer and critic, Guggenheim Fellow
 Lynne Berry (Ph.D. 1997) – American writer and poet
 Diann Blakely (M.A. 1980) – American poet
 Campbell Bonner (B.A. 1896, M.A. 1897) – American classicist
 Jack Boone (B.A., M.A., Ph.D.) – American writer, O. Henry Award Winner (1932)
 William Brittelle (B.M. 1999) – electro-acoustic composer
 Cleanth Brooks (B.A. 1928) – founder of New Criticism, The Well Wrought Urn (1947)
 Thomas G. Burton (M.A. 1958, Ph.D 1966) – American author
 Marshall Chapman (B.A. 1971) – singer-songwriter, author
 Brainard Cheney – novelist, playwright and essayist, member of the Southern Agrarians
 Mel Chin (B.A. 1975) – conceptual visual artist, MacArthur Fellow (2019)
 Charles Edward Choate – American architect
 Tiana Clark (M.F.A. 2017) – American poet
 Clyde Connell – American abstract expressionist sculptor
 Alfred Leland Crabb (B.A. Peabody) – American author of historical fiction
 Bruce Crabtree – American architect
 Francis Craig – American songwriter, including Vanderbilt fight song "Dynamite" (1922)
 Compton Newby Crook* (B.A. 1929) – American science fiction writer, Hugo Award winner, namesake of the Compton Crook Award
 David Dark (Ph.D. 2011) – American writer
 Donald Davidson (B.A. 1917, M.A. 1922) – novelist, poet, and opera librettist
 Ky Dickens (B.A. 2000) – filmmaker and writer, best known for her 2009 documentary Fish out of Water
 James Dickey (B.A. 1949) – author and poet, winner of the National Book Award for Poetry, author of the novel Deliverance
 Julia Lester Dillon* (B.A. 1890) – landscape architect, inscribed upon the Georgia Women of Achievement in 2003
 Marjorie K. Eastman (M.B.A.) – author of The Frontline Generation, 2017 Independent Publishers National Book Award winner
 Ruth Denson Edwards* (B.A. 1913) – American hymnwriter and figure in the Sacred Harp movement
 William Eggleston – American photographer
 Francis Perry Elliott – novelist known for screen adaptions The Square Deceiver (1917) and Pals First (1926)
 Karen Essex (M.F.A 1999) – American historical novelist known for Leonardo's Swans and Stealing Athena
 Jesse Hill Ford (B.A. 1951) – writer of Southern Literature
 Frances Fowler – American painter
 Ellen Gilchrist – National Book Award-winning author
 Red Grooms – multimedia artist most associated with pop art
 Kelsie B. Harder (B.A. 1950, M.A. 1951) – onomastician
 Costen Jordan Harrell (M.A. 1910) – writer and bishop of The Methodist Church
 William Harrison (M.A. 1959) – American novelist, short story writer, and screenwriter, Burton and Speke, Rollerball, Guggenheim Fellow (1973)
 Eric L. Harry (BA 1980, MBA 1983, JD 1984) – American author best known for his novels Arc Light and Invasion
 Ross Hassig (M.A. 1974) – anthropologist, author, Mesoamerica scholar
 Sylvia Hyman* (M.A. 1963) – American sculptor and ceramic artist
 William Inge (Peabody, 1935) – Pulitzer Prize-winning playwright, best known for Picnic
 Michelle Izmaylov (M.D.) – bestselling writer of fantasy-fiction books
 George Pullen Jackson (B.A. 1902) – American musicologist, pioneer in the field of Southern American hymnody
 Randall Jarrell (M.A. 1938) – United States Poet Laureate
 Madison Jones (B.A. 1949) – novelist, member of the Southern Agrarians
 Donika Kelly (M.A. 2009) – American poet, winner of the 2015 Cave Canem prize
 Mark Kendall (B.A. 2005, M.A. 2008) – American artist and filmmaker, La Camioneta (2012), Guggenheim Fellow
 Matthew Washington Kennedy* (Ph.D.) – American classical pianist and composer
 Mark Thomas Ketterson (B.A. 1976) – performing arts journalist and critic Opera News
 Perry Lentz (M.A. 1966, Ph.D. 1970) – author, Woodrow Wilson Fellow and Rockefeller Foundation grant holder
 Alan LeQuire (B.A. 1978) – American sculptor
 Andrew Nelson Lytle (B.A. 1925) – novelist and professor
 Evan Mack (B.M. 2003) – composer, librettist and pianist
 Ellis K. Meacham (LL.B 1937) – authored a Napoleonic era nautical adventure trilogy published by Little, Brown (US) and Hodder & Stoughton (UK)
 Greg Miller (B.A. 1979) – poet
 Jim Wayne Miller (Ph.D. 1965) – American Appalachian poet
 Merrill Moore (B.A. 1924) – poet
 W. R. Moses (Ph.D.) – American poet
 Philip Nel (Ph.D. 1997) – American scholar of children's literature
 Adrienne Outlaw – sculptor
 Edd Winfield Parks (Ph.D. 1929) – American writer and essayist
 H. Clinton Parrent Jr. – American architect
 James Patterson (M.A. 1970) – bestselling contemporary writer of thrillers
 Jon Parrish Peede (B.A.) – former chairman of the National Endowment for the Humanities
 John Crowe Ransom (B.A. 1909) – poet and essayist, founder of New Criticism, Rhodes Scholar
 Fahmi Reza – Malaysian political street artist and documentarian
 Graham Robb FRSL (Ph.D. 1986) – British author, The Discovery of France, Chevalier of the Ordre des Arts et des Lettres
 Kaira Rouda (B.A. 1985) – American novelist
 Daniel Bernard Roumain (B.M 1993) – composer, performer, violinist, and band-leader
 Robert Ryman* – American painter associated with monochrome painting, minimalism, and conceptual art
 David P. Sartor – composer and conductor
 Steven D. Schroeder (B.A.) – American poet
 Tom Schulman (B.A. 1972) – Academy Award-winning screenwriter of the film Dead Poets Society
 Jeanne Ellison Shaffer (Ph.D. 1970) – American composer
 Beasley Smith – American composer and big band musician
 Samuel L. Smith* (M.A. 1918) – American practical architect
 Elizabeth Spencer (M.A. 1943) – writer of the novella The Light in the Piazza
 Laura Spong (B.A. 1948) – Abstract expressionist painter
 James Still (M.A. 1930) – American poet, novelist and folklorist, best known for the novel River of Earth (1940)
 Georgia Stitt (B.M 1994) – American composer and lyricist, arranger, conductor, and musical director
 H.R. Stoneback (Ph.D. 1970) – American academic, poet, and folk singer, Hemingway, Durrell, and Faulkner scholar
 Jesse Stuart – American writer, Guggenheim Fellow
 Amy H. Sturgis (Ph.D.) – author, speaker and scholar of science fiction/fantasy studies and Native American studies
 Walter Sullivan (B.A. 1947) – southern novelist and literary critic, founding charter member of the Fellowship of Southern Writers
 Allen Tate (B.A. 1922) – United States Poet Laureate
 Eleanor Ross Taylor – American poet, 2010 Ruth Lilly Poetry Prize
 Peter Taylor – novelist, short story writer, and playwright, 1987 Pulitzer Prize for Fiction
 Nafissa Thompson-Spires (M.A. 2005, Ph.D. 2009) – American writer, 2019 Whiting Award
 Pat Toomay – NFL defensive end, author of Any Given Sunday, basis for Oliver Stone's eponymous film (1999)
 William Trowbridge (Ph.D. 1975) – American poet, Academy of American Poets Prize
 Robert Turner (M.A. 1950) – Canadian composer, appointed Order of Canada in 2002
 Robert Penn Warren (B.A. 1925) – Pulitzer Prize winner, United States Poet Laureate, author of All the King's Men (1946)
 Geoffrey R. Waters (B.A.) – poet and translator, Willis Barnstone Translation Prize
 Sarah Webb – Contemporary realist painter
 James Whitehead (B.A., M.A.) – poet, 1972 Guggenheim Fellow
 Ralph Wickiser* (M.A. 1935, Ph.D. 1938) – American painter
 Greg Williamson – poet, known for the invention of the "Double Exposure" form in which one poem can be read three different ways
 Martin Wilson (B.A. 1995) – writer best known for his award-winning debut novel What They Always Tell Us
 Terri Witek (B.S. 1983, M.A. 1984, Ph.D. 1988) – poet, Slope Editions Prize, Center for Book Arts Prize Winner
 Kat Zhang (B.A. 2013) – American science-fiction novelist, What's Left of Me (2012)

Athletics

Baseball
 Pedro Alvarez – infielder, Pittsburgh Pirates (2010–15), Baltimore Orioles (2016–18)
 Mike Baxter – outfielder, San Diego Padres (2010), New York Mets (2011–13), Los Angeles Dodgers (2014), Chicago Cubs (2015)
 Tyler Beede – pitcher, San Francisco Giants (2018–present)
 Walker Buehler – pitcher, Los Angeles Dodgers (2017–present); All-Star (2019)
 Vin Campbell – outfielder, Chicago Cubs (1908), Pittsburgh Pirates (1910–11), Boston Braves (1912), Indianapolis Hoosiers (1914), and Newark Peppers (1915)
 Curt Casali – catcher, Tampa Bay Rays (2014–17), Cincinnati Reds (2018), San Francisco Giants (present)
 Wilson Collins – outfielder, Boston Braves (1913–1914)
 Doc Cook – outfielder, New York Yankees (1913–1916)
 Joey Cora – second baseman, Cleveland Indians (1998); Seattle Mariners (1995–98/ All-Star 1997); Chicago White Sox (1991–94); San Diego Padres (1987, 1989–90)
 Caleb Cotham – pitcher, New York Yankees (2015), Cincinnati Reds (2016)
 Slim Embry – starting pitcher, Chicago White Sox (1923)
 Ryan Flaherty – infielder, Baltimore Orioles (2012–17), Atlanta Braves (2018), Cleveland Indians (2019); coach, San Diego Padres (2020–present)
 Carson Fulmer – pitcher, Chicago White Sox (2016–present)
 Sonny Gray – pitcher, Oakland Athletics (2013–17), New York Yankees (2017–18), Cincinnati Reds (2019–present); All-Star (2015, 2019)
 Harvey Hendrick – New York Yankees (1923–24), Cleveland Indians (1925), Brooklyn Robins (1927–31), Cincinnati Reds (1931–32), St. Louis Cardinals (1932), Chicago Cubs (1933), Philadelphia Phillies (1934)
 Matt Kata – infielder, Arizona Diamondbacks (2003–05), Philadelphia Phillies (2005), Texas Rangers, Pittsburgh Pirates (2007), Houston Astros (2009)
 Tony Kemp – second baseman, outfielder, Houston Astros (2016–19), Chicago Cubs (2019), Oakland Athletics (2020–present)
 Jensen Lewis – broadcaster; pitcher, Cleveland Indians (2005–11), Arizona Diamondbacks (2012), Chicago Cubs (2013); Roberto Clemente Award nominee (2010)
 Scotti Madison – third baseman, Detroit Tigers (1985–86), Kansas City Royals (1987–88), Cincinnati Reds (1989)
 Austin Martin – shortstop, Toronto Blue Jays (2020–present)
 Mike Minor – starting pitcher, Atlanta Braves (2010–14), Kansas City Royals (2017), Texas Rangers (2018–20), Oakland Athletics (2020–present); All-Star (2019)
 Scrappy Moore – third baseman, St. Louis Browns (1917)
 Penn Murfee – pitcher, United States national baseball team, 2019 WBSC Premier12
 Josh Paul – catcher, Arizona Diamondbacks (2003–05), Philadelphia Phillies (2005), Texas Rangers (2007), Pittsburgh Pirates (2007), Houston Astros (2009)
 David Price – starting pitcher, Los Angeles Dodgers; All-Star (2010–12, 2014, 2015), Cy Young Award (2012), World Series champion (2018)
 Andy Reese – infielder/outfielder, New York Giants (1927–30)
 Bryan Reynolds – outfielder, Pittsburgh Pirates (2019–present)
 Antoan Richardson – outfielder, Atlanta Braves (2011), New York Yankees (2014); first base coach, San Francisco Giants (2020–present)
 Scott Sanderson – Montreal Expos, Chicago Cubs, Oakland Athletics, New York Yankees, California Angels, San Francisco Giants, Chicago White Sox, California Angels (1978–96); All-Star (1991)
 Sam Selman – pitcher, San Francisco Giants (2019–present)
 Rip Sewell – starting pitcher, Detroit Tigers (1932), Pittsburgh Pirates (1938–1949); 4× All-Star (1943–1946)
 Justus Sheffield – pitcher, New York Yankees (2018), Seattle Mariners (2019–present)
 Jeremy Sowers – pitcher, Cleveland Indians (2006–09); executive, Tampa Bay Rays (2020–present)
 Dansby Swanson – shortstop, Atlanta Braves (2016–present); Haarlem Baseball Week Gold (2014)
 Drew VerHagen – pitcher, Detroit Tigers (2014–19), Hokkaido Nippon-Ham Fighters (2020–present)
 Casey Weathers – pitcher, Colorado Rockies (2007–10), Chicago Cubs (2011–12); Bronze Medal, 2008 Summer Olympics
 Mike Willis – pitcher, Toronto Blue Jays (1977–81)
 Rhett Wiseman – outfielder, Washington Nationals (Minor League); Team Israel, World Baseball Classic (2017)
 Kyle Wright – pitcher, Atlanta Braves (2018–present)
 Mike Yastrzemski – outfielder, San Francisco Giants (2019–present); Willie Mac Award (2020)
 Josh Zeid – pitcher, Houston Astros (2013–14); Team Israel, World Baseball Classic (2017)

Basketball
 Chantelle Anderson – women's basketball (1999–2003); Sacramento Monarchs (2003–04), San Antonio Silver Stars (2005–07)
 Wade Baldwin IV – men's basketball (2014–16); Memphis Grizzlies (2016–17), Portland Trail Blazers (2017–19), now with Maccabi Tel Aviv of the Israeli Basketball Premier League
 Rhonda Blades – women's basketball (1991–95); New York Liberty (1997), Detroit Shock (1998)
 Derrick Byars – men's basketball (2005–07); SEC Player of the Year (2007); Chicago Bulls (2010), San Antonio Spurs (2012)
 Charles Davis – men's basketball (1976–81); Washington Bullets (1981–84), Milwaukee Bucks (1984–87), San Antonio Spurs (1987), Chicago Bulls (1988–90)
 Festus Ezeli – men's basketball (2008–12); Golden State Warriors (2012–16), Portland Trail Blazers (2016–17), NBA Champion (2015)
 Mariella Fasoula – women's basketball (2018–20); Greek national team
 Butch Feher – men's basketball (1972–76); Phoenix Suns (1976–77)
 Johnny "Red" Floyd – football and basketball (1915–16, 1919–20); namesake of Johnny "Red" Floyd Stadium
 Jeff Fosnes – men's basketball (1972–1976); 1st Academic All-American; fourth-round draft pick, Golden State Warriors (1976)
 Shan Foster – men's basketball (2005–08); second team Associated Press All-American; 2008 SEC Player of the Year
 Rod Freeman – men's basketball (1970–73); Philadelphia 76ers (1973–74)
 Matt Freije – men's basketball (2000–04); New Orleans Hornets (2004–05), Atlanta Hawks (2006)
 Ronald Green (1944–2012) – American-Israeli men's basketball player
 John Jenkins – men's basketball (2009–12); All-SEC (2011, 2012); Atlanta Hawks (2012–15), Dallas Mavericks (2015–16), Phoenix Suns (2016–17), New York Knicks (2019)
 Damian Jones – men's basketball (2013–16); Golden State Warriors (2016–19), Atlanta Hawks (2019–present); NBA Champion (2017, 2018)
 Hutch Jones – men's basketball (1979–82); San Diego Clippers (1982–83)
 Zuzana Klimešová – women's basketball (2001); Czech former basketball player, Olympian in the 2004 Summer Olympics
 Frank Kornet – men's basketball (1985–89); Milwaukee Bucks (1989–91)
 Luke Kornet – men's basketball (2013–17); New York Knicks (2017–19), Chicago Bulls (2019–present)
 Dan Langhi – men's basketball (1996–2000); Houston Rockets (2000–02), Phoenix Suns (2002–03), Golden State Warriors (2003), Milwaukee Bucks (2003)
 Clyde Lee – men's basketball (1963–66); SEC Player of the Year (1966), All-American (1966); San Francisco/Golden State Warriors (1966–74), Atlanta Hawks (1975), Philadelphia 76ers (1975–76)
 Matt Maloney – men's basketball (1990–91); Houston Rockets (1996–99), Chicago Bulls (2000), Atlanta Hawks (2000–03)
 Billy McCaffrey – men's basketball (1991–93); two-time All-American; SEC Player of the Year (1993)
 Aaron Nesmith – men's basketball (2018–20); Boston Celtics (2020–present)
 Will Perdue – men's basketball (1983–88); Chicago Bulls (1988–95), San Antonio Spurs (1995–99), Portland Trail Blazers (2000–01), 4× NBA Champion (1991–1993, 1999)
 Sheri Sam – women's basketball (1992–96); WNBA Charlotte Sting (2005–06), Seattle Storm (2004), Minnesota Lynx (2003), Miami Sol (2000–02), Orlando Miracle (1999)
 Simisola Shittu (born 1999) – men's basketball; British-born Canadian basketball player for Ironi Ness Ziona of the Israeli Basketball Premier League
 Jeffery Taylor – men's basketball (2008–12); Charlotte Hornets (2012–15), Real Madrid (2015–present), EuroLeague Champion (2018)
 Carla Thomas – women's basketball (2003–07); Chicago Sky (2007)
 Jeff Turner – men's basketball (1980–84); New Jersey Nets (1984–87); gold medalist at the 1984 Summer Olympics
 Jan van Breda Kolff – men's basketball (1971–74); SEC Player of the Year (1974); Denver Nuggets (1974–75), New York / New Jersey Nets (1976–83)
 Perry Wallace – men's basketball (1967–70); first African-American basketball player in the SEC; U.S. Department of Justice attorney; professor of law, American University (1993–2017)
Payton Willis (born 1998) - ment's basketball (2016-18); plays in the Israeli Basketball Premier League

Football
 Bob Asher – offensive tackle (1967–69); Dallas Cowboys (1970–71), Chicago Bears (1972–75), Super Bowl VI Champion
 Earl Bennett – wide receiver (2005–08); 3× All-SEC (2005–06), Cleveland Browns (2008–14), Chicago Bears (2014)
 Lynn Bomar – end (1921–24); New York Giants (1925–26); College Football Hall of Fame (1956)
 Mack Brown – running back (1969–70); head coach, University of Texas (1998–2013), University of North Carolina (1988–97, 2019–  )
 Watson Brown – quarterback (1969–72); head coach, Austin Peay (1979–80), Cincinnati (1983), Rice (1984–85), Vanderbilt (1986–90), UAB (1995–2006), Tennessee Tech (2007–  )
 Corey Chavous – safety (1994–98); Arizona Cardinals (1998–2001), Minnesota Vikings (2002–05), St. Louis Rams (2006–08)
 Josh Cody – tackle (1914–1916, 1919); 3× All-American, College Football Hall of Fame (1970)
 David Culley – quarterback (1974–1977); head coach, Houston Texans (2021– )
 Zach Cunningham – linebacker (2014–16); First-team All-American (2016); Houston Texans (2017–  )
 Bucky Curtis – defensive back (1947–1950); Cleveland Browns (1951), Toronto Argonauts (1955–56); All-American (1950)
 Jay Cutler – quarterback (2002–05); Denver Broncos (2006–09), Chicago Bears (2009–16), Miami Dolphins (2017); "100 Greatest Bears of All-Time"
 Art Demmas – linebacker (1952–56), captain (1956); NFL Official (1970–96)
 Jamie Duncan – linebacker (1995–97), All-American (1997); Tampa Bay Buccaneers (1998–2001), St. Louis Rams (2002–03), Atlanta Falcons (2004)
 Ewing Y. Freeland – tackle (1909–12); head coach, SMU (1922–23), Texas Tech (1925–28), Austin College (1936–38)
 Jonathan Goff – linebacker (2005–07); New York Giants (2008–11); Super Bowl XLVI Champion
 Clarence "Pete" Gracey – center (1930–32); All-American (1932)
 Corey Harris – safety (1988–91); Green Bay Packers (1992–94), Seattle Seahawks (1995–96), Miami Dolphins (1997), Baltimore Ravens (1998–2001), Detroit Lions (2002–03)
 Casey Hayward – cornerback (2008–11); Green Bay Packers (2012–15), Los Angeles Chargers (2016–  ); 2× Pro Bowl (2016, 2017); NFL interceptions leader (2016)
 Hunter Hillenmeyer – linebacker (1999–2002); Chicago Bears (2003–10); NFC Champion (2006)
 Carl Hinkle – center (1935–37), Southeastern Conference MVP (1937), College Football Hall of Fame (1959)
 Elliott Jones – fullback (1890–92); captain (1890–92)
 W. J. "Cap" Keller – quarterback (1893–94); captain (1893–1894)
 Everett "Tuck" Kelly – guard (1922–24); All-Southern (1923), captain (1924)
 Oliver "Doc" Kuhn – quarterback (1920–1923); captain (1923); Porter Cup (1923)
 Frank Kyle – quarterback (1902–05); head coach, Ole Miss (1908)
 Clark Lea – fullback (2002–04); defensive coordinator for Notre Dame (2018–20), head coach for Vanderbilt (2021–  )
 David Lee – quarterback (1971–75); captain (1974); head coach, University of Texas at El Paso (1989–93), NFL quarterback coach (2003–  )
 Allama Matthews – wide receiver (1979–82), Atlanta Falcons (1983–85)
 D. J. Moore – cornerback (2006–08); Chicago Bears (2009–2012), Carolina Panthers (2013), Tampa Bay Buccaneers (2014)
 Jess Neely – halfback (1920–22); captain (1922); head coach, Rice University (1940–67), Vanderbilt athletic director (1967–71, 1973)
 Dick Plasman – end and captain (1936), Chicago Bears (1937–41, 1944), Chicago Cardinals (1946–47), 3× NFL Champion, last NFL player to play without a helmet
 Shelton Quarles – middle linebacker (1990–93); Tampa Bay Buccaneers (1997–2006); Super Bowl XXXVII Champion
 Tom Redmond – defensive tackle (1955–58); St. Louis Cardinals (1960–65)
 Herb Rich – safety (1946–49); Baltimore Colts (1950), Los Angeles Rams (1951–53), New York Giants (1954–56)
 Bob Rives – tackle (1923–25); All-Southern (1924–1925); Newark Bears (1926)
 Bo Rowland – end (1923–24); head coach, Henderson-Brown (1925–30), The Citadel (1940–42), Oklahoma City (1946–47), George Washington (1948–51)
 Justin Skule – offensive tackle (2015–2019); San Francisco 49ers (2019–  )
 Rupert Smith – halfback, quarterback (1921); SIAA Champion (1921)
 Bill Spears – quarterback (1925–27); College Football Hall of Fame (1962)
 Matt Stewart – linebacker (1997–2000); Atlanta Falcons (2001–04), Cleveland Browns (2005–07)
 Whit Taylor – quarterback (1979–1982); ArenaBowl I Champion (1987), SEC Football Legend (2003)
 Ke'Shawn Vaughn – running back (2017–19); SEC Newcomer of the Year (2018); Tampa Bay Buccaneers (2020–  )
 Bradley Vierling – center (2008–09); Pittsburgh Steelers (2010), Jacksonville Jaguars (2010–11), Pittsburgh Steelers (2012)
 Bill Wade – quarterback (1949–51); Southeastern Conference MVP (1951); Los Angeles Rams (1954–60), Chicago Bears (1961–66), NFL Champion (1963)
 Henry Wakefield – end (1921–1924); consensus All-American (1924), All-Southern (1923, 1924)
 E. M. "Nig" Waller – quarterback (1924–26); head coach, Middle Tennessee (1933–1934)
 Stephen Weatherly – defensive end (2013–15); Minnesota Vikings (2016–19), Carolina Panthers (2020–  )
 Chris Williams – offensive tackle (2005–07); Chicago Bears (2008–12), St. Louis Rams (2012–13), Buffalo Bills (2014)
 Jimmy Williams – defensive back (1997–2000); San Francisco 49ers (2001–04), Seattle Seahawks (2005–06), Houston Texans (2008)
 Jamie Winborn – linebacker (1998–2000); 49ers (2001–05), Jaguars (2005–06), Buccaneers (2006–07), Broncos (2007–08), Titans (2009–10)
 DeMond Winston – linebacker (1986–89), captain (1989); New Orleans Saints (1990–94)
 Will Wolford – offensive lineman (1983–85); Buffalo Bills (1986–93), Indianapolis Colts (1993–96), Pittsburgh Steelers (1996–98), 3× Pro Bowl (1990, 1992, 1995)
 Todd Yoder – tight end (1996–99); Tampa Bay Buccaneers (2000–03), Jacksonville Jaguars (2004–05), Washington Redskins (2006–09), Super Bowl XXXVII Champion

Other athletes
 Marina Alex – American professional golfer, Cambia Portland Classic Winner (2018)
 Lawson Aschenbach – professional racing driver; 4× Pirelli World Challenge Champion, 2014 Lamborghini Super Trofeo World Champion
 Josie Barnes – American ten-pin bowler, 2021 U.S. Women's Open champion
 Maria Bulanova – Russian ten-pin bowler, youngest player ever to win a European Bowling Tour title, age 14 (2013)
 Fernanda Contreras – Mexican professional tennis player, 2017 Riviera All-American Championship
 Jon Curran – American professional golfer, PGA Championship T33 (2016)
 Julie Ditty – American professional tennis player, career-high WTA Tour ranking No. 89 (2008)
 Andrea Farley – American professional tennis player, career-high WTA Tour ranking No. 118 (1989)
 Walter Glasgow – American sailor, silver medal, fleet/match race keelboat open (Soling) mixed, 1976 Summer Olympics
 Lina Granados – Colombian professional soccer player; defender, FF Lugano 1976
 Ásthildur Helgadóttir – Icelandic soccer player, Iceland women's national football team (1993–2007), Breiðablik, KR, Malmö FF Dam
 Tony Kuhn – American soccer player; forward, Major League Soccer
 Peter Lamb – South African professional tennis player, 1978 Davis Cup team, Wimbledon (1980)
 Luke List – American professional golfer, PGA Championship 6th (2019)
 Cheyna Matthews – Jamaican footballer; forward, Washington Spirit, Jamaica women's national team
 Scott A. Muller – Panamanian-American canoeist, whitewater slalom in the K-1 event at the 1996 Summer Olympics
 Joan Pennington – competition swimmer who won one silver and two gold medals at the 1978 World Aquatics Championships, qualified for the 1980 Summer Olympics
 Gil Reese – first three-sport captain (1922–25), halfback on the football team, forward on the basketball team, and outfielder on the baseball team
 Bobby Reynolds – American professional tennis player, career-high ATP Tour ranking No. 63 (2009); ATP doubles title with Andy Roddick, RCA Championships (2006)
 Jence Ann Rhoads – professional handball and basketball player, Huakar, Sepsi SIC, ICM Arad; Cupa României (2014); CB Atlético Guardés
 Matthias Schwab – Austrian professional golfer, PGA European Tour
 Peter Sharis – American olympic rower, competed in the men's coxless pair event at the 1992 Summer Olympics
 Astra Sharma – Australian professional tennis player, career-high WTA Tour ranking No. 85 (2019)
 Brandt Snedeker – American professional golfer, 2007 PGA Rookie of the Year, 2012 Tour Championship Winner
 Chelsea Stewart – Canadian soccer player, defender for the German Bundesliga club SC Freiburg
 Jerry Sularz – Polish soccer player, Górnik Wałbrzych (1967–1973)
 Aleke Tsoubanos – American professional tennis player, 4× ITF Women's World Tennis Tour Circuit titles
 Shannon Vreeland – competition swimmer, 2012 United States Olympic team, gold medal in the 4×200-meter freestyle relay at the 2012 London Summer Olympics

Business and economics 
 Bilikiss Adebiyi Abiola (M.S.) – Nigerian CEO of Wecyclers in Lagos, Nigeria
 Jasbina Ahluwalia (B.A. 1991, M.A. 1992) – founder and CEO, Intersections Match
 Michael Ainslie (B.A. 1965) – former president and CEO of Sotheby's
 Anu Aiyengar (M.B.A. 1999) – head of mergers and acquisitions at JPMorgan Chase & Co
 James M. Anderson (J.D. 1966) – former president and CEO of the Cincinnati Children's Hospital Medical Center
 John D. Arnold (B.A. 1995) – founder of Centaurus Energy and Arnold Ventures LLC, youngest self-made billionaire in Texas
 Paul S. Atkins (J.D. 1983) – CEO of Patomak Global Partners LLC
 Bill Bain (B.A. 1959) – founder of Bain & Company
 Thomas W. Beasley (J.D. 1973) – co-founder of CoreCivic
 Horace E. Bemis (B.S. 1891) – founder of the Ozan Lumber Company
 Michael Bickford (B.A.) – founder and CEO of Round Hill Capital
 Dennis C. Bottorff (B.E. 1966) – chairman and CEO of the First American Corporation; co-founder, Council Capital
 James Cowdon Bradford Sr. (College, 1912) – chairman of Piggly Wiggly, founder of J.C. Bradford & Co.
 James W. Bradford (J.D. 1974) – former CEO of AFG Industries
 Michael Burry (M.D. 1997) – founder of the Scion Capital LLC hedge fund, portrayed by Christian Bale in the 2015 film The Big Short
 Kelly Campbell (B.S. 2000) – president of Hulu
 Monroe J. Carell, Jr. (B.S. 1959) – former chairman and CEO of Central Parking Corporation
 Dong-se Cha (M.A. 1974, Ph.D. 1978) – Korean economist, former president of the Korea Development Institute
 Whitefoord Russell Cole (B.A. 1894) – former president of the Louisville and Nashville Railroad
 John Cooper (M.B.A. 1985) –  former global head of technology investment banking at Lehman Brothers
 Alejandro E. Martínez Cuenca (Ph.D. 1999) – owner of Joya de Nicaragua
 Mark Dalton (J.D. 1975) – CEO of the Tudor Investment Corporation, Vanderbilt board of trust chairman (2010–2017)
 John Danner (MEd 2002) – co-founder and CEO of Rocketship Education, co-founder of NetGravity, the world's first advertising server company
 Joe C. Davis, Jr. (B.A. 1941) – founder and CEO of Davis Coals, Inc.
 Krista Donaldson (B.E. 1995) – CEO of D-Rev
 David Dyer (B.E. 1971) – former CEO of Land's End and Tommy Hilfiger
 Dan K. Eberhart (B.A.) – CEO of Canary, LLC, managing partner of Eberhart Capital, LLC
 John Edgerton (A.B. 1902, M.A.1903) – industrialist, president of the National Association of Manufacturers (1921–1931)
 John A. Elkington (B.A.) – American developer, founding board member of the National Civil Rights Museum
 Bruce R. Evans (B.E. 1981) – managing director of Summit Partners, Vanderbilt board of trust chairman
 David Farr (M.B.A. 1981) – chairman and CEO of Emerson Electric
 Mark L. Feidler (J.D. 1981) – chairman of Equifax
 Erik Feig (1988–89) – president of Lionsgate Motion Picture Group
 Zula Inez Ferguson (B.A.) – advertising manager at Blackstone's, Los Angeles
 Greg Fischer (B.A. 1980) – co-invented and founded SerVend International, sold to The Manitowoc Company
 Sam M. Fleming (B.A. 1928) – former president of the American Bankers Association
 Adena Friedman (M.B.A. 1993) – president and CEO of NASDAQ
 Thomas F. Frist Jr. (B.A. 1960) – billionaire entrepreneur, co-founder of the Hospital Corporation of America
 Mahni Ghorashi (M.B.A. 2012) – co-founder of Clear Labs
 Mitch Glazier (J.D. 1991) – chairman and CEO of the Recording Industry Association of America
 Francis Guess (M.B.A.) – businessman and civil rights advocate, United States Commission on Civil Rights
 John Hall (B.E. 1955) – former chairman and CEO of Ashland Oil
 Arthur B. Hancock III (B.A. 1965) – American owner of thoroughbred racehorses, owner of Stone Farm
 Matthew J. Hart (B.A. 1974) – former chairman and CEO of Hilton Hotels Corporation
 Robert D. Hays (J.D. 1983) – chairman of King & Spalding
 Bruce Henderson (B.S. 1937) – founder of the Boston Consulting Group
 Robert Selph Henry (LL.B 1910, B.A. 1911) – vice president of the Association of American Railroads (1934–1958)
 Bruce Heyman (B.A. 1979, M.B.A. 1980) – vice president and managing director of private wealth management at Goldman Sachs
 Chris Hollod (B.A. 2005) – venture capitalist and angel investor
 David S. Hong (M.A. 1967) – 5th president of the Taiwan Institute of Economic Research
 Frank K. Houston (B.A. 1904) – president and chairman of the Chemical Corn Exchange Bank
 Allan Hubbard (B.A. 1969) – director of the National Economic Council
 David Bronson Ingram (M.B.A. 1989) – chairman and president of Ingram Entertainment
 John R. Ingram (M.B.A. 1986) – billionaire chairman and CEO of the Ingram Content Group
 Orrin H. Ingram II (B.A. 1982) – CEO of Ingram Industries, chairman of the Ingram Barge Company
 Paul Jacobson (MBA 1997) – CFO of Delta Air Lines
 Prashant Khemka (M.B.A. 1998) – former CIO of global emerging markets at Goldman Sachs, founder of White Oak Capital Management
 J. Hicks Lanier (B.A. 1962) – chairman and CEO of Oxford Industries
 Sartain Lanier (B.A. 1931) – chairman and CEO of Oxford Industries
 Chong Moon Lee (M.L.S. 1959) – founder of Diamond Multimedia
 Oliver Luckett (B.A. 1996) – American entrepreneur, founded Revver
 R. Brad Martin (E.M.B.A. 1980) – former chairman and CEO of Saks Incorporated
 Mark P. Mays (B.A. 1985) – president and CEO of Clear Channel Communications
 Mike McWherter (J.D. 1981) – chairman of the board of First State Bank
 Lydia Meredith (M.B.A) – former CEO of the Renaissance Learning Center
 Todd Miller (B.A. 1988) – media executive, CEO of Celestial Tiger Entertainment
 Ann S. Moore (B.A. 1971) – former chairman and CEO of Time Inc.
 Jackson W. Moore (J.D. 1973) – former executive chairman of Union Planters Bank and Regions Financial Corporation
 J. Reagor Motlow (B.A. 1919) – former president of Jack Daniel's
 Mubyarto (M.A. 1962) – Indonesian economist, developer of Pancasila economics, Bintang Jasa Utama (1994)
 Tim Murray (E.M.B.A. 2003) – CEO of Alba
 Roy Neel (B.A. 1972) – president and CEO of the United States Telecom Association
 Ralph Owen (B.A. 1928) – chairman of American Express
 Kevin Parke (B.A. 1981) – president of the Todd Wagner Foundation, former president of Landmark Theatres
 Doug Parker (M.B.A. 1986) – chairman, president, and CEO of American Airlines Group
 Sunil Paul (B.E. 1987) – entrepreneur, founder of Brightmail, co-founder and CEO of Sidecar
 Brittany Perkins (B.A. 2008) – CEO of AshBritt Environmental
 H. Ross Perot, Jr. (B.A. 1981) – billionaire chairman and CEO of Perot Systems, former owner of the Dallas Mavericks
 Charles Plosser (B.E. 1970) – president of the Federal Reserve Bank of Philadelphia, former co-editor of the Journal of Monetary Economics
 Edgar E. Rand (B.A. 1927) – former president of the International Shoe Company
 Frank C. Rand (B.A. 1898) – former president of the International Shoe Company, Vanderbilt board of trust chairman (1935–1949)
 Henry Hale Rand (B.A. 1929) – former president of the International Shoe Company
 Alexis Readinger (B.A. 1996) – founder of Preen, Inc.
 Mark Reuss (B.A. 1986) – president of General Motors
 Catherine Reynolds (B.S. 1979) – former CEO of EduCap, chairman/CEO, Catherine B. Reynolds Foundation, Bloomberg Businessweek top 50 philanthropic Americans
 Russ Robinson (B.A. 1979) – founder and CEO of Global Steel Dust
 Joe L. Roby (B.A. 1961) – chairman emeritus, Credit Suisse investment banking division
 Jeffrey J. Rothschild (B.A. 1977, M.S. 1979) – billionaire entrepreneur and executive, founding engineer of Facebook
 Mike Shehan (B.S. 1994) – co-founder and CEO of SpotX
 Jane Silber (M.S.) – former CEO of Canonical Ltd.
 Chip Skowron (B.A. 1990) – portfolio manager at FrontPoint Partners
 John Sloan Jr. (B.A. 1958) – VP of the First American National Bank, President and CEO of the National Federation of Independent Business
 Alexander C. Taylor (B.A. 1997) – president and CEO of Cox Enterprises
 Betty Thayer (M.B.A. 1982) – CEO of Exec-appointments.com, sold to Financial Times
 Hall W. Thompson – founder and developer of Shoal Creek Club
 Cal Turner, Jr. (B.A. 1962) – billionaire CEO of Dollar General
 William S. Vaughn (B.A. 1923) – Rhodes Scholar, former president and chairman of Eastman Kodak
 Thomas B. Walker, Jr. (B.A. 1947) – Goldman Sachs senior director, Vanderbilt board of trust
 Emily White (B.A. 2000) – former COO of Snapchat, current board member of Hyperloop One
 Christopher J. Wiernicki (B.S.) – chairman, president, and CEO of American Bureau of Shipping
 Darrin Williams (J.D. 1993) – CEO of Southern Bancorp Inc.
 Jesse Ely Wills (B.A. 1922) – chairman of the National Life and Accident Insurance Company
 David K. Wilson (B.A. 1941) – co-founder and president of Cherokee Equity, chairman of Genesco, Vanderbilt board of trust chairman (1981–91)
 Toby S. Wilt (B.E. 1967) – president, TSW Investment Company, director, CapStar Bank
 Philip C. Wolf (M.B.A. 1980) – founder and CEO of PhoCusWright
 Muhammad Yunus (Ph.D. 1971) – founder of Grameen Bank, pioneer of microcredit; 2006 Nobel Peace Prize winner, 2009 Presidential Medal of Freedom

Entertainment and fashion 
 Rachel Baiman – American folk singer-songwriter
 Jim Beavers (M.B.A. 1996) – American songwriter, former director of marketing for Capitol Records
 Dierks Bentley (B.A. 1997) – country musician
 Curtis Benton – actor, 20,000 Leagues Under the Sea (1916), Jealousy (1916), Kid Galahad (1937); writer, The Uninvited Guest (1924)
 Cinda Boomershine (B.A. 1994) – founder of fashion accessory line Cinda b
 Harold Bradley* (B.A. 1949) – American session guitarist and entrepreneur, Musician's Hall of Fame (2007)
 Joe Bob Briggs (B.A. 1974) – syndicated American film critic, writer, actor, and comic performer
 Logan Browning (B.A. 2011) – American actress, lead in Dear White People
 Paula Cale – actress best known for her role as Joanie Hansen on the series Providence
 Rosanne Cash (B.A. 1979) – Grammy Award-winning singer and songwriter
 Fred Coe* – American television and Broadway producer and director, Peabody and Emmy Award winner
 Rod Daniel (B.A. 1964) – American television and film director best known for the Michael J. Fox film Teen Wolf (1985)
 Kim Dickens (B.A. 1987) – actress, Deadwood (2004–06), Gone Girl (2014), House of Cards (2015–17)
 Deena Dill (B.S. 1992) – American actress and television executive producer
 Jimmie Dodd – host of the Walt Disney's The Mickey Mouse Club, actor, Easter Parade (1948), Quicksand (1950)
 George Ducas (B.A. 1989) – country music artist
 Bob Ferguson (M.A.) – Billboard-topping songwriter, senior record producer for RCA Victor
 Chad Gervich (B.A. 1996) – television writer; playwright; author, Small Screen, Big Picture: A Writers Guide to the TV Business
 Amy Grant – six-time Grammy-winning contemporary Christian music artist (dropped out)
 William Gray Espy – actor, The Young and the Restless
 Richard Hull (B.A. 1992) –  American media and entertainment executive; producer, She's All That; 2011 NAACP Image Award
 Claude Jarman Jr. – American former child actor, received a special Academy Award as outstanding child actor of 1946 for The Yearling
 Kevin Royal Johnson (B.E. 1984) – American singer-songwriter, founding member of The Linemen
 Duncan Jones – British film director, Source Code (2011), Warcraft (2016), Mute (2018), BAFTA Award winner
 Edward Kerr (B.A. 1990) – actor, Pretty Little Liars, starred in Above Suspicion
 Charles D. King (B.A. 1991) – producer of Fences (2016), Mudbound (2017), Judas and the Black Messiah (2021)
 Jill King (B.A. 1996) – country music artist
 Lance Kinsey (B.A. 1975) – Canadian actor and screenwriter, best known for his role as Lt. Proctor in the Police Academy film series
 Richard Kyanka (M.A.) – creator of humor website Something Awful
 Susanna Kwan (M.F.A.) – Hong Kong singer and actress, Heart of Greed, Moonlight Resonance
 Lunic (B.S. 1999) – songwriter, singer, electronic musician, & multi-instrumentalist Kaitee Page
 Steven Machat (J.D. 1977) – entertainment mogul and producer
 Chris Mann (B.M. 2004) – singer; fourth place in season 2 of The Voice
 Delbert Mann (B.A. 1941) – Academy Award-winning director for Marty (1955)
 Theresa Meeker (M.Ed) – American written, web, and video content creator
 James Melton – American popular music actor/singer, Stars Over Broadway (1935), Ziegfeld Follies (1945)
 R. Stevie Moore – multi-instrumentalist singer-songwriter who pioneered lo-fi/DIY music
 Zack Norman – American entertainer and film financier, known for his role as Ira in Romancing the Stone (1984)
 Bettie Page* (B.A. 1944) – American model, 1950s pin-up icon
 Zhubin Parang (B.A. 2003) – head writer of The Daily Show
 Saladin K. Patterson – writer, Frasier, The Bernie Mac Show; creator and executive producer, The Wonder Years
 Woody Paul (B.E. 1977) – member of Riders in the Sky
 Michael Pollack (B.A. 2016) – Grammy-nominated Top 40 songwriter and record producer
 Amy Ray – singer, songwriter, member of the Indigo Girls (transferred)
 Donna Sachet (B.A. 1976) – American drag actor, singer, and activist
 Dinah Shore (B.A. 1938) – top-charting female vocalist of the 1940s; actress; television host, The Dinah Shore Show, Dinah!
 Scott Siman (B.A. 1976) – music executive, artist manager, former chairman of the Academy of Country Music
 Molly Sims – model, actress (dropped out to pursue modeling)
 Brock Speer (M.Div.) – bass singer for the Speer Family Southern Gospel group
 Chris Stapleton (dropped out) – singer-songwriter, guitarist, and record producer
 Stephanie Storey (B.A. 1997) – actress; screenwriter; director; novelist; producer, The Writers' Room
 Amanda Sudano – American singer-songwriter, member of Johnnyswim
 Brooklyn Sudano – model, actress, and singer
 Mikey Wax – singer-songwriter
 Tim Weiland (B.A. 2006) – fashion designer and DJ; founder, creative director, Timo Weiland
 Whitney Wolanin (B.S. 2011) – American singer and songwriter
 Paul Worley (B.A. 1972) – American record producer, discovered Lady Antebellum and the Dixie Chicks
 Andrea Zonn (B.M.) – singer and fiddle player

Government, politics, and activism

U.S. vice presidents
 John Nance Garner (Law, 1886) – 32nd vice president of the United States and 39th speaker of the United States House of Representatives
 Al Gore (Div, 1971–72) – 45th vice president of the United States; former U.S. senator; former U.S. representative; environmental activist; Nobel laureate (2007)

U.S. Cabinet and heads of federal agencies
 Lamar Alexander (B.A. 1962) – 5th United States Secretary of Education
 Jake Brewer (B.S. 2004) – White House senior policy adviser in the Office of Science and Technology Policy, Obama administration
 H. Lee Buchanan III (B.S. 1971, M.S. 1972) – 4th Assistant Secretary of the Navy (Research, Development and Acquisition)
 Robert W. Cobb (B.A. 1982) – NASA Inspector General (2002–2009)
 Tom Cochran (B.A.) – White House Director of New Media Technologies, Obama administration
 Bill Corr (J.D. 1973) – 9th Deputy Secretary of the United States Department of Health and Human Services
 James Danly (J.D. 2013) – commissioner of the Federal Energy Regulatory Commission
 Norman Davis – 2nd Under Secretary of State; represented the U.S. at the Paris Peace Conference, League of Nations, and Geneva Conference
 Paul Rand Dixon (B.A. 1936) – former chairman and 14th Commissioner of the Federal Trade Commission (1961–1969, 1976)
 John Edgerton (B.A. 1902, M.A. 1903) – held economic executive appointments by President Warren G. Harding and President Herbert Hoover
 William Yandell Elliott (B.A. 1918) – member of the Fugitives, Rhodes Scholar, political advisor to six U.S. presidents
 Phyllis Fong (J.D. 1978) – inspector general of the United States Department of Agriculture
 Vince Foster – former Deputy White House Chief of Staff
 J. Christopher Giancarlo (J.D. 1984) – 38th chairman of the United States Commodity Futures Trading Commission (CFTC)
 Tipper Gore (M.A. 1975) – activist, 35th Second Lady of the United States
 E. William Henry (J.D. 1957) – 14th chairman of the Federal Communications Commission
 Allan B. Hubbard (B.A. 1969) – economic adviser to President George W. Bush, 6th director of the National Economic Council
 Gus Hunt (B.E. 1977, M.E. 1982) – chief technology officer at the CIA
 Mickey Kantor (B.A. 1951) – 11th United States Trade Representative, 31st United States Secretary of Commerce
 Robert L. King (J.D. 1971) – Assistant Secretary of Education, serving as head of the Office of Postsecondary Education
 Bill Lacy (B.A.) – political operative, business executive, and director of the Robert J. Dole Institute of Politics
 Howard Liebengood (J.D. 1967) – 27th Sergeant at Arms of the United States Senate
 Marvin H. McIntyre – 17th Secretary to the President of the United States, Franklin D. Roosevelt
 James Clark McReynolds (B.S. 1882) – 48th Attorney General of the United States
 Roy Neel (B.A. 1972) – deputy chief of staff for former president Bill Clinton; 8th chief of staff for Al Gore
 Paul C. Ney Jr. (JD, MBA 1984) – General Counsel of the Department of Defense of the United States, Trump administration
 Jerry Parr (B.A. 1962) – United States Secret Service agent, credited with helping to save President Reagan's life on the day of his assassination attempt
 Stephen D. Potts (B.A. 1952, LL.B 1954) – 4th director of the United States Office of Government Ethics
 Roger Ream (B.A. 1977) – president of The Fund for American Studies (TFAS)
 Phil Reitinger (B.E. 1984) – former director of the National Cybersecurity Center at the Department of Homeland Security
 John Wesley Snyder – 54th United States Secretary of the Treasury
 Hans von Spakovsky (J.D. 1984) – 22nd Federal Election Commission Commissioner
 Nancy Soderberg (B.A. 1980) – foreign policy advisor, strategist, U.S. National Security Council, representative to the United Nations Security Council
 Jay Solomon (B.A. 1942) – 10th Administrator of the General Services Administration
 John R. Steelman (M.A. 1924) – 1st White House Chief of Staff, Truman Administration
 Gordon O. Tanner (J.D. 1973) – General Counsel of the Air Force
 Jon R. Thomas (M.A. 1995) – Assistant Secretary of State for International Narcotics Matters, United Nations Commission on Narcotic Drugs
 John J. Tigert (B.A. 1904) – 7th United States Commissioner of Education
 Stephen Vaden (B.A.) – general counsel of the United States Department of Agriculture, Trump administration
 Carlos Clark Van Leer (LL.B 1895) – Chief of the Personnel Classification Board, United States Department of the Treasury
 Stephen Vaughn (B.A. 1988) – former acting United States Trade Representative, general counsel to the United States Trade Representative
 Jack Watson (B.A. 1960) – 9th White House Chief of Staff, Carter Administration
 Gus W. Weiss (B.A.) – White House policy adviser on technology, intelligence and economic affairs, worked on the Farewell Dossier

U.S. governors
 Greg Abbott (J.D. 1984) – 48th governor of Texas (2015– )
 Lamar Alexander (B.A. 1962) – 45th governor of Tennessee (1979–1987)
 Andy Beshear (B.A. 2000) – 61st governor of Kentucky (2019– )
 Theodore Bilbo (Peabody, Law, 1900) – 39th and 43rd governor of Mississippi (1916–1920; 1928–1932)
 Frank G. Clement – 41st governor of Tennessee (1963–1967)
 Prentice Cooper (Col 1914–1916) – 39th governor of Tennessee (1939–1945)
 Lee Cruce (Law, 1885) – 2nd governor of Oklahoma (1911–1915)
 Jeff Davis (Law, 1882) – 20th governor of Arkansas (1901–1907)
 William Haselden Ellerbe – 86th governor of South Carolina (1897–1899)
 Joseph W. Folk (LL.B 1890) – 31st governor of Missouri (1905–1909)
 Hill McAlister (LL.B 1897) – 34th governor of Tennessee (1933–1937)
 Malcolm R. Patterson (Law, 1882) – 30th governor of Tennessee (1907–1911)
 Park Trammell – 21st governor of Florida (1913–1917)

Members of the U.S. Senate
 Lamar Alexander (B.A. 1962) – United States senator from Tennessee (2003–2021)
 Theodore Bilbo (Peabody, Law, 1900) – United States senator from Mississippi (1935–1947)
 Jeff Davis – United States senator from Arkansas (1907–1913)
 Nathaniel B. Dial – United States senator from South Carolina (1919–1925)
 James Eastland (Col 1925–1926) – United States senator from Mississippi (1943–1978), President pro tempore (1972–1978)
 Duncan U. Fletcher (LL.B 1880) – United States senator from Florida (1909–1936), led the Pecora Commission
 Bill Hagerty (B.A. 1981, J.D. 1984) – United States senator from Tennessee (2021– )
 John Neely Kennedy (B.A. 1973) – United States senator from Louisiana (2017– )
 Harlan Mathews (MPA 1958) – United States senator from Tennessee (1993–1994)
 Floyd M. Riddick (M.A. 1932) – parliamentarian of the United States Senate (1964 to 1974), developed Riddick's Senate procedure
 Jim Sasser (B.A. 1958, LL.B 1961) – United States senator from Tennessee (1977–1995)
 William V. Sullivan (LL.B 1875) – United States senator from Mississippi (1898–1901)
 Fred Dalton Thompson (J.D. 1967) – United States senator from Tennessee (1994–2003)
 Park Trammell – United States senator from Florida (1917–1936)

Members of the U.S. House of Representatives
 William Vollie Alexander, Jr. (J.D. 1960) – United States representative from Arkansas (1969–1993)
 Robert E. Lee Allen* – United States representative from West Virginia (1923–1925)
 James Benjamin Aswell* (B.A. 1893) – United States representative from Louisiana (1913–1931)
 Richard Merrill Atkinson (B.A. 1916) – United States representative from Tennessee (1937–1939)
 Jim Bacchus (B.A. 1971) – United States representative from Florida (1991–1995)
 Laurie C. Battle – United States representative from Alabama (1947–1955)
 Robin Beard (B.A. 1961) – United States representative from Tennessee (1973–1983)
 Richard Walker Bolling (grad. studies 1939–1940) – United States representative from Missouri (1979–1983)
 Bill Boner (M.A. 1969) – United States representative from Tennessee (1979–1987)
 John L. Burnett (Law 1876) – United States representative from Alabama (1899–1919)
 Jo Byrns (LL.B 1882) – 41st speaker of the United States House of Representatives
 Joseph W. Byrns Jr. (J.D. 1928) – United States representative from Tennessee (1938–1941)
 Steve Cohen (B.A. 1971) – United States representative from Tennessee (2007– )
 W. Wirt Courtney – United States representative from Tennessee (1939–1949)
 Ewin L. Davis (Col. 1895–97) – United States representative from Tennessee (1919–1933)
 William A. Dickson – United States representative from Mississippi (1909–1913)
 Joe L. Evins (B.A. 1933) – United States representative from Tennessee (1953–1977)
 John W. Gaines (M.D. 1882) – United States representative from Tennessee (1897–1909)
 William Wirt Hastings (J.D. 1889) – United States representative from Oklahoma (1915–1921)
 French Hill (B.S. 1978) – United States representative from Arkansas (2015– )
 Sam Hobbs – United States representative from Alabama (1935–1951)
 Henderson M. Jacoway (J.D. 1898) – United States representative from Arkansas (1911–1923)
 Joseph T. Johnson (LL.B 1883) – United States representative from South Carolina (1901–1915)
 Ric Keller (J.D. 1992) – United States representative from Florida (2001–2009)
 Richard Kelly – United States representative from Florida (1975–1981)
 Jen Kiggans (M.S.N 2012) – United States representative from Virginia (2023– )
 Charles Landon Knight (B.A. 1889) – United States representative from Ohio (1921–1923)
 Charles M. La Follette (J.D.) – United States representative from Indiana (1943–1947)
 Leonard Lance (J.D. 1977) – United States representative from New Jersey (2009–2019)
 Fritz G. Lanham (Law, 1897–98) – United States representative from Texas (1919–1947)
 Oscar Lovette (J.D. 1896) – United States representative from Tennessee (1931–1933)
 Luke Messer (J.D. 1994) – United States representative from Indiana (2013–2019)
 Malcolm R. Patterson (Law, 1882) – United States representative from Tennessee (1901–1906)
 James Percy Priest* – United States representative from Tennessee (1941–1956)
 Ben Quayle (J.D. 2002) – United States representative from Arizona (2011–2013)
 Frazier Reams (J.D. 1922) – United States representative from Ohio (1951–1955)
 Charles C. Reid (J.D. 1887) – United States representative from Arkansas (1901–1911)
 John Rose (J.D. 1993) – United States representative from Tennessee (2019– )
 J. William Stokes (M.D. 1888) – United States representative from South Carolina (1896–1901)
 Charles Swindall – United States representative from Oklahoma (1920–1921)
 Joseph E. Washington (LL.B 1874) – United States representative from Tennessee (1887–1897)

U.S. Supreme Court justices
 James Clark McReynolds (B.S. 1882) – Associate Justice of the Supreme Court of the United States (1914–1941)

U.S. Ambassadors and diplomats
 Alvin P. Adams Jr. (LL.B 1967) – former United States Ambassador to Peru, Haiti, and Djibouti
 Waldo Emerson Bailey* (M.A. 1927) – U.S. Consul to London, England
 John Barrett – former United States Ambassador to Colombia, Panama, and Argentina
 William J. Cabaniss (B.A. 1960) – 5th United States Ambassador to the Czech Republic
 Roxanne Cabral (B.A.) – 10th United States Ambassador to the Marshall Islands
 Brian E. Carlson (B.A. 1969) – 10th United States Ambassador to Latvia
 William Prentice Cooper, Jr. – 31st United States Ambassador to Peru
 Marion V. Creekmore Jr. (B.A. 1961) – 8th United States Ambassador to Sri Lanka and the Maldives
 K. Terry Dornbush (B.A. 1955) – 60th United States Ambassador to the Netherlands
 Guilford Dudley (B.A. 1929) – 49th United States Ambassador to Denmark
 Thomas C. Ferguson (B.A. 1955, J.D. 1959) – 2nd United States Ambassador to Brunei
 William Hagerty (B.A. 1981, J.D. 1984) – 30th United States Ambassador to Japan
 Bruce Heyman (B.A. 1979, M.B.A. 1980) – 30th United States Ambassador to Canada
 Greta C. Holtz (B.S. 1982) – United States Ambassador to Oman and Qatar
 Marshall Fletcher McCallie (B.A. 1967) – 2nd United States Ambassador to Namibia
 Louis J. Nigro Jr. (Ph.D. 1979) – 19th United States Ambassador to Chad
 W. Robert Pearson (B.A. 1965) – 23rd United States Ambassador to Turkey, president of IREX
 Gautam A. Rana (J.D. 1997) – 10th United States Ambassador to Slovakia 
 Jim Sasser (B.A. 1958, J.D. 1961) – 44th United States Ambassador to China
 Linda Ellen Watt (B.A. 1973) – 36th United States Ambassador to Panama

Mayors
 Megan Barry (MBA 1993) – former mayor of Nashville Tennessee
 Ann Womer Benjamin (B.A. 1975) – mayor of Aurora, Ohio
 Bill Boner (M.A. 1969) – former mayor of Nashville, Tennessee
 Beverly Briley – former mayor of Nashville, Tennessee
 Bill Campbell (B.A. 1974) – former mayor of Atlanta, Georgia
 Miguel Colasuonno (Ph.D.) – former mayor of São Paulo, Brazil
 John Cooper (M.B.A. 1985) – mayor of Nashville, Tennessee
 Thomas L. Cummings Sr. (J.D. 1915) – former mayor of Nashville, Tennessee
 Karl Dean (J.D. 1981) – former mayor of Nashville, Tennessee
 J. Kane Ditto (J.D. 1969) – former mayor of Jackson, Mississippi
 Greg Fischer (B.A. 1980) – mayor of Louisville, Kentucky
 Jim Gray (B.A. 1975) – former mayor of Lexington, Kentucky
 Dorsey B. Hardeman (LL.B 1931) – former mayor of San Angelo, Texas
 Pam Hemminger (B.A. 1982) – mayor of Chapel Hill, North Carolina
 Nelson Madore (Ed.D. 1982) – former mayor of Waterville, Maine
 Dee Margo (B.A. 1974) – mayor of El Paso, Texas
 Bill Purcell (J.D. 1979) – former mayor of Nashville, Tennessee
 Steven Reed (MBA 2004) – mayor of Montgomery, Alabama
 Woodall Rodgers (B.A. 1912) – mayor of Dallas, Texas
 Sam Sutter (J.D. 1983) – former mayor of Fall River, Massachusetts
 Tom Tait (J.D., M.B.A. 1985) – mayor of Anaheim, California
 Joseph Vas (B.A) – former mayor of Perth Amboy, New Jersey
 Ben West – former mayor of Nashville, Tennessee

Other U.S. state officials
 Jon Applebaum (B.A. 2007) – former member of the Minnesota House of Representatives
 Bruce Bennett (J.D. 1949) – 38th Attorney General of Arkansas
 Preston Lang Bethea* (B.A. 1891) – member of the South Carolina Senate
 Bob Blake (LL.B 1908) – president of the Missouri Constitutional Convention in 1944
 Will Bond (B.A. 1992) – member of the Arkansas Senate
 William West Bond (B.A. 1907) – 62nd speaker of the Tennessee Senate
 George Street Boone (J.D. 1941) – member of the Kentucky House of Representatives
 Peter Breen (B.E. 1997) – member of the Illinois House of Representatives
 Dick Brewbaker (B.S. 1983) – former member of the Alabama Senate
 Tony Brown (M.A.) – former member of the Kansas House of Representatives
 Lance Cargill (J.D. 1996) – lawyer and former speaker of the Oklahoma House of Representatives
 William Prentice Cooper, Sr. (B.A. 1890) – speaker of the Tennessee House of Representatives
 Brad Courtney (B.A. 1981) – chairman of the Republican Party of Wisconsin
 Alexander G. Crockett (M.D. 1885) – former member of the Virginia Senate
 Cal Cunningham – former member of the North Carolina Senate
 Riley Darnell (J.D. 1965) – 37th Tennessee Secretary of State
 Walter Naylor Davis (B.A. 1898) – 34th Lieutenant governor of Missouri
 Neria Douglass (J.D. 1977) – 50th Maine State Treasurer
 Steve Freudenthal (J.D. 1975) – 28th Attorney General of Wyoming
 Chris Gebhard (B.A. 1996) – member of the Pennsylvania Senate
 Bill Gibbons (J.D.) – District Attorney General of Memphis, Tennessee
 Mary Stuart Gile (Ed.D. 1982) – former member of the New Hampshire House of Representatives
 Michele Guyton (B.A. 1989) – member of the Maryland House of Delegates
 Dorsey B. Hardeman (LL.B 1931) – former member of the Texas House of Representatives and the Texas Senate
 William C. Harrison (Ed.D. 1985) – former chairman of the North Carolina State Board of Education
 Beth Harwell (M.S. 1979, Ph.D. 1982) – 81st speaker of the Tennessee House of Representatives, member of the board of directors of the Tennessee Valley Authority
 Douglas Henry (B.A. 1949, J.D. 1951) – member of the Tennessee Senate, activist
 Roy Herron (J.D. 1980, M.Div. 1980) – former chairman of the Tennessee Democratic Party
 Ashley Hudson (B.A. 2001) – member of the Arkansas House of Representatives
 David J. Jordan (J.D. 1979) – chair of the Board of Regents of the Utah System of Higher Education
 Jonathan Jordan (M.B.A. 1992) – former member of the North Carolina House of Representatives
 Harold A. Katz (B.A. 1943) – former member of the Illinois House of Representatives
 Robert L. King (J.D.) – former member of the New York State Assembly
 Naomi C. Matusow (B.A. 1960) – member of the New York State Assembly
 William Harding Mayes (LL.B 1881) – Lieutenant governor of Texas
 J. Washington Moore (B.A. 1890, LL.B 1891) – Eminent Supreme Archon of Sigma Alpha Epsilon, 1891–1894
 Seth Walker Norman – former member of the Tennessee House of Representatives
 Mary Margaret Oliver (B.A. 1969) – member of the Georgia House of Representatives
 Howard T. Owens Jr. (J.D. 1959) – former member of the Connecticut Senate
 Steve Owens (J.D. 1981) – chairman of the Arizona Democratic Party
 E. Melvin Porter (J.D. 1959) – member of the Oklahoma Senate, civil rights leader
 Barbara Rusling (B.A. 1966) – former member of the Texas House of Representatives
 Edward T. Seay (LL.B 1891) – former speaker of the Tennessee Senate
 Amanda Septimo (B.A. 2021) – member of the New York State Assembly
 David H. Simmons (J.D. 1977) – president pro tempore of the Florida Senate
 David Simpson (B.A. 1983) – former member of the Texas House of Representatives
 W. P. Sims (B.A. 1899) – former member of the Arizona Senate
 Charlie Stallworth (M.Div.) – member of the Connecticut House of Representatives
 Joe Straus (B.A. 1982) – speaker of the Texas House of Representatives
 Jim Summerville (M.A. 1983) – former member of the Tennessee Senate
 John Peroutt Taylor (M.D. 1881) – 32nd Mississippi State Treasurer
 Paul Thurmond (B.S. 1998) – former member of the South Carolina Senate
 Joseph Vas (B.A) – former member of the New Jersey General Assembly
 Jody Wagner (J.D. 1980) – 12th Virginia Secretary of Finance
 Justin P. Wilson (J.D. 1970) – lawyer, Comptroller of Tennessee

Foreign presidents, prime ministers, heads of government
 Abdiweli Mohamed Ali (M.A. 1988) – 15th Prime Minister of Somalia, 8th President of Puntland
 Chung Won-shik (M.A. 1958, Ph.D. 1966) – 21st Prime Minister of South Korea
 José Ramón Guizado (B.E. 1920) – 17th President of Panama
 Thomas C. Jefferson,  (M.A. 1975) – 1st Premier of the Cayman Islands

Other foreign officials
 Carlos Gerardo Acevedo (Ph.D.) – 9th president of the Central Reserve Bank of El Salvador
 Jawad Anani (M.A. 1970) – former Minister of Labor of Jordan
 Lawrence Ang – director of the Commercial Affairs Department of Singapore
 Jusuf Anwar (M.A. 1978) – 25th Minister of Finance of Indonesia, 15th Indonesian Ambassador to Japan
 Jim Bacchus (B.A. 1971) – former chairman of the Appellate Body of the World Trade Organization
 Bijaya Nath Bhattarai (M.A. 1979) – 13th governor of the Nepal Rastra Bank
 Abdallah Bou Habib (Ph.D. 1975) – 48th Minister of Foreign Affairs of Lebanon
 Grace Coleman (M.A. 1979) – former MP of Ghana and Ghanaian Ambassador to the Netherlands
 Yeda Crusius (M.A. 1971) – 36th governor of the Brazilian state of Rio Grande do Sul
 María de Lourdes Dieck-Assad (M.A. 1976) – former Mexican ambassador to Belgium and Luxembourg; European Council representative
 Gazi Erçel (M.A. 1976) – 10th governor of the Central Bank of Turkey, former deputy executive director, IMF
 Ibrahim Eris (Ph.D. 1975) – 15th president of the Central Bank of Brazil
 Abu Hena Mohammad Razee Hassan (M.A.) – chief executive, Bangladesh Financial Intelligence Unit
 Patrick Ho (M.D. 1976) – 4th Secretary for Home Affairs, Hong Kong
 Mario Miguel Carrillo Huerta (M.A. 1976) – member of the Chamber of Deputies of the LXII Legislature of the Mexican Congress
 Kwon Hyouk-se (M.A. 1998) – 8th governor of the Financial Supervisory Service of South Korea
 Abdallah Kigoda (M.A. 1980) – 8th Minister of Industry and Trade of Tanzania
 Redley A. Killion (M.A. 1978) – 6th vice president of Micronesia
 Rudolf Kujath (M.A. 1971) – former member of the Abgeordnetenhaus of Berlin
 Irek Kusmierczyk (Ph.D. 2010) – member of the Parliament of Canada for Windsor—Tecumseh
 Liang Kuo-shu (Ph.D. 1970) – 14th governor of the Central Bank of the Republic of China
 Ashwin Mahesh (M.S. 1993) – former national vice president of the Lok Satta Party in India
 Moshe Mendelbaum (M.A. 1960) – 4th governor of the Bank of Israel
 Dante Mossi (Ph.D. 1996) – executive president of the Central American Bank for Economic Integration
 Yoo Myung-hee (J.D. 2002) – former Minister of Trade of South Korea
 Ihor Petrashko (M.B.A. 2001) – 3rd Minister of Economic Development and Trade of Ukraine
 Pedro Pinto Rubianes – 44th vice president of Ecuador
 Syahril Sabirin (Ph.D. 1979) – 11th governor of the Bank of Indonesia
 Baso Sangqu (M.A. 1999) – former president of the United Nations Security Council, South African Permanent Representative
 Süreyya Serdengeçti (M.A. 1986) – Turkish economist and 11th governor of the Central Bank of Turkey
 Soemarno Sosroatmodjo (M.A.) – 5th governor of Jakarta, Indonesia
 Thorsteinn Thorgeirsson (M.A. 1988) – former director-general of the Icelandic Ministry of Finance
 Wang Tso-jung (M.A. 1958) – 6th president of the Control Yuan of the Government of the Republic of China, Order of Propitious Clouds (2013)

Activists
 Will W. Alexander (B.Th. 1912) – founder of the Commission on Interracial Cooperation
 John Amaechi,  – English psychologist, consultant, first former NBA player to come out publicly (transferred)
 Akosua Adomako Ampofo (Ph.D. 2000) – Ghanaian public intellectual, activist and scholar, Fulbright Scholar
 Elizabeth Lee Bloomstein (B.A. 1877 Peabody) – American history professor, clubwoman, and suffragist
 David Boaz (B.A. 1975) – executive vice-president, Cato Institute, leading libertarian thinker
 Yun Chi-ho (Div. 1888–1891) – political activist and thinker during the late 1800s and early 1900s in Joseon Korea
 George Childress* (B.A. 1826 Peabody) – lawyer, politician, and a principal author of the Texas Declaration of Independence
 J. McRee Elrod* (M.A. 1953) – Methodist activist for the Civil Rights Movement, anti-war movements of the 1960s, and the gay pride movement
 Hiram Wesley Evans – dental student (did not graduate), Imperial Wizard of the Ku Klux Klan
 Peter Farb (B.A. 1950) – author and noted spokesman for environmental conservation
 Tom Fox (B.A. 1973) – Quaker peace activist, kidnapped on November 26, 2005, in Baghdad, leading to the 2005–2006 Christian Peacemaker hostage crisis
 Morris Frank (B.A. 1929) – founder of The Seeing Eye, the first guide-dog school in the United States, activist for accessibility for the visually impaired
 John E. Fryer (M.D. 1962) – gay rights activist known for his anonymous speech at the 1972 American Psychiatric Association conference where he appeared in disguise as Dr. Henry Anonymous
 Bennett Haselton (M.A.) – founder of Circumventor.com and Peacefire.org, listed in Google Vulnerability Program Hall Of Fame for finding and fixing security holes in Google products
 John Jay Hooker (J.D. 1957) – American lawyer, entrepreneur, political gadfly, special assistant to Robert F. Kennedy
 Elizabeth Dearborn Hughes (B.A. 2006) – founder of the Akilah Institute in Kigali, Rwanda's first women's college
 Howard Kester (B.D. 1931) – clergyman and social reformer, organized the Southern Tenant Farmers Union designed by President Franklin D. Roosevelt
 George Ross Kirkpatrick – American anti-militarist writer and political activist, 1916 vice presidential nominee of the Socialist Party of America
 James Lawson (M.Div. 1960) – civil rights pioneer
 Robert V. Lee (B.A. 1972) – humanitarian, Episcopal priest, chairman and CEO of FreshMinistries, HIV/AIDS activist
 Millicent Lownes-Jackson (M.B.A., Ph.D.) – founder, The World Institute for Sustainable Education and Research (The WISER Group)
 Sara Alderman Murphy (B.A. 1945) – civil rights activist, founder of Peace Links
 Marie Ragghianti (B.S. 1975) – American parole board administrator, whistleblower who exposed Ray Blanton's "clemency for cash" scandal
 Arthur F. Raper (M.A. 1925) – sociologist, Commission on Interracial Cooperation
 Charlie Soong (B.Th. 1885) – Chinese missionary and businessman, key figure in the Xinhai Revolution of 1911, father of the Soong sisters
 Julie Tien (M.L.S.) – Taiwanese politician and activist, National Women's League of Taiwan
 Madhavi Venkatesan (B.A., M.A., Ph.D.) – economist and environmental activist, founder and executive director of Sustainable Practices
 Don West (D.Div. 1932) – civil rights activist, labor organizer, poet, educator
 Marie C. Wilson (B.A. 1962) – founder and president emerita of The White House Project, founder of Ms. Foundation for Women
 Wolf Wolfensberger* (Ph.D. 1962) – influencer of disability policy through his development of social role valorization, exposed Nazi death camp targeting of the disabled

Journalism and media 
 Michelle Alexander (B.A. 1989) – author of The New Jim Crow, columnist for The New York Times, Truman Scholar
 Joseph Alexander Altsheler – American reporter and editor, New York World
 Thomas J. Anderson (B.A. 1934) – American columnist and publisher, American Party presidential nominee in 1976
 Skip Bayless (B.A. 1974) – Fox Sports personality and nationally syndicated columnist
 William E. Beard (B.A. 1893) – journalist, war correspondent, naval historian
 Roy Blount Jr. (B.A 1963) – humorist, sportswriter, and author
 Mel Bradford (Ph.D. 1962) – paleoconservative political commentator
 David Brinkley – broadcast journalist, NBC and ABC; Emmy and Peabody Award winner; Presidential Medal of Freedom (1992)
 Samuel Ashley Brown (Ph.D. 1958) – founder of the literary magazine Shenandoah
 Innis Brown (B.A. 1906) – sporting editor of The Atlanta Journal, Rhodes Scholar
 Deena Clark (M.A.) – television news reporter and journalist, The Deena Clark Show on CBS
 Lorianne Crook (B.A. 1978) – radio and television host, co-host of Crook & Chase
 Terrance Dean (M.A., Ph.D.) – former MTV executive and author of Hiding in Hip-Hop
 Alonso Duralde (B.A. 1988) – senior film critic, The Wrap; syndicate writer, Reuters
 Linda Ellerbee (A&S 1962–64) – American journalist for NBC News, host of Nick News with Linda Ellerbee
 Eric Etheridge (B.A. 1979) – first editor of George magazine; author, Breach of Peace (2008)
 Frye Gaillard (B.A. 1968) – former editor at The Charlotte Observer
 Willie Geist (B.A. 1997) – humorist and host on NBC's Today, anchor of Sunday Today with Willie Geist, co-anchor of MSNBC's Morning Joe
 Laurentino Gomes – Brazilian journalist and writer, author of 1808 and 1822
 John Steele Gordon (B.A. 1966) – business and finance writer, Wall Street Journal contributor
 Fred Graham (LL.B 1959) – chief anchor and managing editor of the former Court TV, legal correspondent for the New York Times, and CBS News
 Clint Grant – photojournalist featured in Paris Match, Newsweek, Time, and Life, covered the assassination of John F. Kennedy
 Amelia Greenhall (B.E. 2009) – co-founder and executive director of Double Union, tech blogger
 George Zhibin Gu – Chinese political and economic journalist 
 Alex Heard (B.A. 1980) – editorial director of Outside magazine; editor and writer for The New York Times Magazine, The New Republic, The Washington Post and Slate
 Molly Henneberg (B.S. 1995) – correspondent, Fox News
 Hunter Hillenmeyer (B.A. 2003) – financial columnist for TheStreet.com
 Henry Blue Kline (M.A. 1929) – member of the Southern Agrarians
 Hildy Kuryk (B.A. 1999) – director of communications, Vogue; former national finance director, Democratic National Committee
 Paul Lakeland (Ph.D. 1981) – British author, contributing blogger to The Huffington Post and a contributing writer to Commonweal
 Jincey Lumpkin (B.A. 2002) – producer and columnist for the Huffington Post, named one of the 100 most influential gay people by Out Magazine
 Andrew Maraniss (B.A. 1992) – author of Strong Inside: Perry Wallace and the Collision of Race and Sports in the South
 Ralph McGill (B.A. 1916) – anti-segregationist Atlanta Constitution editor and publisher, 1959 Pulitzer Prize for Editorial Writing
 Don McNay (M.A.) – financial author and The Huffington Post contributor
 Buster Olney (B.A. 1988) – ESPN baseball writer, former sportswriter for The New York Times
 Richard Quest – British reporter, anchor for CNN International
 Wendell Rawls, Jr. (B.A. 1970) – journalist at The Philadelphia Inquirer and The New York Times, 1977 Pulitzer Prize for Investigative Reporting
 Grantland Rice (B.A. 1901) – sportswriter, Atlanta Journal, Cleveland News, New York Tribune; namesake, Grantland Rice Trophy
 Fred Russell (B.A. 1927) – sportswriter, Golden Era of Sports, Saturday Evening Post
 Christine Sadler* (B.A. 1927) – pioneer female journalist; reporter and Sunday editor, The Washington Post; Washington, D.C., editor, McCall's
 Jeffrey D. Sadow (Ph.D. 1985) – political scientist, columnist
 Sebastião Salgado (M.A. 1968) – Brazilian social documentary photographer and photojournalist, UNICEF Goodwill Ambassador, Académie des Beaux-Arts
 James Sandler (M.S. 2012) – investigative journalist, New York Times, PBS Frontline; 2004 Pulitzer Prize for Public Service (team)
 Edward Schumacher-Matos (B.A. 1968) – former ombudsman, NPR; reporter; The New York Times and The Wall Street Journal; op-ed columnist, The Washington Post; 1980 Pulitzer Prize (team)
 John Seigenthaler – founding editorial director of USA Today, First Amendment rights advocate, founder of the First Amendment Center
 Elaine Shannon (B.A. 1968) – investigative journalist, former political correspondent for Newsweek and Time
 Jim Squires (B.A. 1966) – former editor of the Chicago Tribune
 James G. Stahlman (B.A. 1916) – publisher of the Nashville Banner, philanthropist, Maria Moors Cabot Prize winner
 Bill Steltemeier (B.A., J.D.) – founding president of the Eternal Word Television Network (EWTN)
 Clay Travis (J.D. 2004) – radio host
 William Ridley Wills (B.A. 1956) – novelist, poet and journalist, member of the Fugitive group, Sunday Editor for the New York World
 Edwin Wilson (B.A. 1950) – theater critic for The Wall Street Journal (1972–1994), former president of the New York Drama Critics' Circle
 E. Thomas Wood (B.A. 1986) – author and journalist

Law

Attorneys
 Lawrence Barcella (J.D. 1970) – criminal defense lawyer, Assistant United States Attorney for the District of Columbia, lead counsel for the House October Surprise Task Force
 Lucius E. Burch Jr. (B.A. 1930, J.D. 1936) – American attorney, best known for his contributions to conservation, civil rights movement and attorney for Martin Luther King Jr.
 Donald Q. Cochran (B.A. 1980, J.D. 1992) – United States Attorney for the United States District Court for the Middle District of Tennessee
 Bobby Lee Cook – defense attorney, inspiration for the television series Matlock main character Ben Matlock, which starred Andy Griffith as a Georgia attorney.
 Hickman Ewing (B.A. 1964) – United States attorney, special prosecutor who oversaw the Whitewater investigation
 Zachary T. Fardon (B.A. 1988, J.D. 1992) – United States Attorney for the Northern District of Illinois, U.S. Attorney in Chicago, appointed by Barack Obama
 Alice S. Fisher (B.A. 1989) – Managing Partner of the Washington, D.C., office of Latham & Watkins LLP., former assistant attorney general for the Criminal Division of the US Department of Justice
 Sylvan Gotshal (B.A. 1917) – American lawyer, known for his advocacy of industrial design rights, founding partner of Weil, Gotshal & Manges
 Margie Pitts Hames (J.D. 1961) – American civil rights lawyer who argued the abortion rights case Doe v. Bolton before the U.S. Supreme Court
 Marci Hamilton (B.A. 1979) – lawyer, won Boerne v. Flores (1997), Constitutional law scholar, Fox Family Pavilion Distinguished Scholar at the University of Pennsylvania
 Robert J. Kabel (J.D. 1972) – attorney and lobbyist with Faegre Baker Daniels, involved in developing the Gramm–Leach–Bliley Act (1999) and the Dodd-Frank Act (2010)
 John Bell Keeble (LL.B 1888) – attorney, co-founded Keeble, Seay, Stockwell and Keeble, Vanderbilt University Law School Dean (1915–29)
 Jack Kershaw (B.A. 1935) – attorney and sculptor who represented James Earl Ray
 James C. Kirby (B.A. 1950) – former chief counsel to the U.S. Senate Judiciary Subcommittee on the Constitution, co-authored the 25th Amendment to the United States Constitution
 Charles M. La Follette (J.D.) – deputy chief of counsel for the post-World War II Nuremberg Trials (1947)
 Alice Martin (B.S. 1978) – former United States Attorney who amassed 140 public corruption convictions and collected approximately $750M in qui tam healthcare fraud settlements
 Emmett McAuliffe (J.D. 1983) – American intellectual property and entertainment lawyer
 James F. Neal (J.D. 1957) – trial lawyer, Watergate prosecutor who prosecuted Jimmy Hoffa and top officials of the Nixon Administration, special investigator of the Abscam and Iran-contra scandals
 John Randolph Neal Jr. (LL.B 1896) – American attorney, best known for his role as chief counsel during the 1925 Scopes trial
 Neil Papiano (LL.B 1961) – American lawyer, and managing partner of Iverson, Yoakum, Papiano & Hatch
 Michelle M. Pettit (J.D. 2001) – Assistant United States Attorney from California, National Security and Cybercrimes Section
 Sam C. Pointer Jr. (A.B. 1955) – attorney in Birmingham, Alabama and a United States district judge for Northern Alabama, noted figure in complex multidistrict class-action litigation
 William Bradford Reynolds (LL.B 1967) – Assistant Attorney General in charge of the US Department of Justice's Civil Rights Division (1981–1988)
 Ronald J. Rychlak (J.D. 1983) – American lawyer, jurist, and political commentator
 James Gordon Shanklin (B.A., LL.B 1935) – lawyer, key player in the investigation of the Kennedy assassination, co-implemented the FBI's National Crime Information Center
 Jack Thompson (J.D. 1976) – Vanderbilt Law School, disbarred attorney and activist against obscenity and violence in media and entertainment
 Horace Henry White (B.A. 1886, LL.B 1887) – American lawyer, authored legal volumes White's Notarial Guide and White's Analytical Index
 Walton J. Wood – American attorney and jurist who served as the first public defender in United States history (1914–1921)

Jurists
 Tamara W. Ashford (J.D. 1994) – Article I judge of the United States Tax Court
 Jennings Bailey (B.L. 1890) – District Judge for the United States District Court for the District of Columbia
 Jeffrey S. Bivins (J.D. 1986) – Chief Justice of the Supreme Court of Tennessee
 Claria Horn Boom (J.D. 1994) – United States district judge of the United States District Court for Eastern and Western Kentucky
 John P. Bourcier (J.D. 1953) – former justice of the Rhode Island Supreme Court
 John K. Bush (B.A. 1986) – U.S. Circuit Court Judge, United States Court of Appeals for the 6th Circuit (2017–present)
 Charles Hardy Carr (B.A. 1925) – United States district judge of the United States District Court for the Southern District of California and Central California
 Albert M. Clark (LL.B 1900) – justice of the Supreme Court of Missouri
 Cornelia Clark (B.A. 1971) – justice of the Supreme Court of Tennessee
 Elijah Allen Cox (B.A. 1909) – federal judge for the United States District Court for the Northern District of Mississippi
 Waverly D. Crenshaw Jr. (J.D. 1981) – Chief Judge of the United States District Court for the Middle District of Tennessee
 Larry Creson (LL.B 1928) – former justice of the Supreme Court of Tennessee
 Frank P. Culver Jr. (B.A. 1911) – former justice of the Supreme Court of Texas
 Martha Craig Daughtrey (B.A. 1964) – senior United States circuit judge of the United States Court of Appeals for the Sixth Circuit
 Frank Drowota (B.A. 1960, J.D. 1965) – former chief justice of the Supreme Court of Tennessee
 Eric Eisnaugle (J.D. 2003) – judge of the Florida Fifth District Court of Appeal
 Julia Smith Gibbons (B.A. 1972) – United States circuit judge of the United States Court of Appeals for the Sixth Circuit
 S. Price Gilbert (B.S. 1883) – former associate justice of the Supreme Court of Georgia
 David J. Hale (B.A. 1982) – United States district judge of the United States District Court for the Western District of Kentucky
 William Joseph Haynes Jr. (J.D. 1973) – former United States district judge of the United States District Court for the Middle District of Tennessee
 Thomas Aquinas Higgins (B.A. 1954, LL.B 1957) – United States district judge of the United States District Court for the Middle District of Tennessee
 John W. Holland (LL.B 1906) – former United States district judge of the United States District Court for the Southern District of Florida
 Andrew O. Holmes (B.S. 1927, LL.B. 1929) – justice of the Tennessee Supreme Court
 Marcia Morales Howard (B.S. 1987) – United States district judge of the United States District Court for the Middle District of Florida
 Oscar Richard Hundley (LL.B 1877) – United States Federal Judge by recess appointment from President Theodore Roosevelt
 Albert C. Hunt (LL.B 1909) – former associate justice of the Supreme Court of Oklahoma
 Edwin Hunt (B.A., J.D.) – appellate advocate, Assistant Attorney General, U.S. checkers champion (1934)
 Daniel E. Hydrick (B.A. 1882) – former associate justice of the Supreme Court of South Carolina
 Alan Bond Johnson (B.A. 1961) – United States district judge of the United States District Court for the District of Wyoming
 William F. Jung (B.A. 1980) – United States district judge of the United States District Court for the Middle District of Florida
 Jeremy Kernodle (J.D. 2001) – United States district judge of the United States District Court for the Eastern District of Texas
 William C. Koch Jr. (J.D. 1972) – former justice of the Supreme Court of Tennessee
 W. H. Kornegay (LL.B 1890) – former associate justice of the Oklahoma Supreme Court, delegate to Oklahoma Constitutional Convention
 James C. Mahan (J.D. 1973) – senior United States district judge of the United States District Court for the District of Nevada
 Jon Phipps McCalla (J.D. 1974) – senior United States district judge of the United States District Court for the Western District of Tennessee
 Leon Clarence McCord (Law, 1900) – senior United States circuit judge of the United States Court of Appeals for the Fifth Circuit
 Travis Randall McDonough (J.D. 1997) – United States district judge of the United States District Court for the Eastern District of Tennessee
 Robert Malcolm McRae Jr. (B.A. 1943) – former United States district judge of the United States District Court for the Western District of Tennessee
 James Clark McReynolds (B.A. 1882) – Supreme Court Justice (1914–1941); Assistant Attorney General (1903–1907)
 Gilbert S. Merritt Jr. (LL.B 1960) – lawyer and jurist, senior United States circuit judge of the United States Court of Appeals for the Sixth Circuit
 Edward H. Meyers (B.A. 1995) – United States Federal Judge of the United States Court of Federal Claims
 Benjamin K. Miller (J.D. 1961) – former chief justice of the Illinois Supreme Court
 Brian Stacy Miller (J.D. 1995) – Chief United States district judge of the United States District Court for the Eastern District of Arkansas
 John Musmanno (J.D. 1966) – senior judge of the Pennsylvania Superior Court
 John Trice Nixon (LL.B 1960) – senior United States district judge of the United States District Court for the Middle District of Tennessee
 Tom Parker (J.D.) – Chief Justice of the Alabama Supreme Court
 Tommy Parker (J.D. 1989) – United States district judge of the United States District Court for the Western District of Tennessee
 Marlin T. Phelps (J.D.) – former chief justice of the Supreme Court of Arizona
 Thomas W. Phillips (J.D. 1969) – senior United States district judge of the United States District Court for the Eastern District of Tennessee
 Jonathan Pittman (J.D. 1990) – associate judge of the Superior Court of the District of Columbia
 Sam C. Pointer Jr. (A.B. 1955) – attorney in Birmingham, Alabama and a United States district judge for Northern Alabama, noted figure in complex multidistrict class-action litigation
 Eli J. Richardson (J.D. 1992) – United States district judge of the United States District Court for the Middle District of Tennessee
 Jay Richardson (B.S. 1999) – U.S. Circuit Court Judge, United States Court of Appeals for the 4th Circuit (2018–present)
 Kevin H. Sharp (J.D. 1993) – United States district judge of the United States District Court for the Middle District of Tennessee
 Eugene Edward Siler Jr. (B.A. 1958) – U.S. Circuit Court Judge, United States Court of Appeals for the 6th Circuit
 Jane Branstetter Stranch (J.D. 1978) – Order of the Coif, United States circuit judge of the United States Court of Appeals for the Sixth Circuit
 Sarah Hicks Stewart (J.D. 1992) – associate justice of the Supreme Court of Alabama
 Aleta Arthur Trauger (M.A. 1972) – United States district judge of the United States District Court for the Middle District of Tennessee
 Emory Marvin Underwood (B.A. 1900) – senior United States district judge of the United States District Court for the Northern District of Georgia
 Thomas A. Varlan (J.D. 1981) – Chief United States district judge of the United States District Court for the Eastern District of Tennessee
 Roger Vinson (J.D. 1971) – senior United States district judge of the United States District Court for the Northern District of Florida, former member of the United States Foreign Intelligence Surveillance Court
 Harry W. Wellford (LL.B 1950) – senior United States circuit judge of the United States Court of Appeals for the Sixth Circuit
 Samuel Cole Williams (LL.B 1884) – noted 19th and 20th century Tennessee jurist, historian, educator, and businessman
 Billy Roy Wilson (J.D. 1965) – senior United States district judge of the United States District Court for the Eastern District of Arkansas
 Thomas A. Wiseman Jr. (B.A. 1952, J.D. 1954) – Senior Judge of the United States District Court for the Middle District of Tennessee
 Staci Michelle Yandle (J.D. 1987) – United States district judge of the United States District Court for the Southern District of Illinois

Military 
 Spence M. Armstrong (transferred to Navy) – United States Air Force Lieutenant General, Defense and Air Force Distinguished Service Medal, NASA Exceptional Service Medal recipient
 Archibald Vincent Arnold (M.A.) – United States Army Major General, 7th Infantry Division during World War II, Army Distinguished Service Medal, former military governor of Korea
 Henry L. Brandon (J.D.) – United States Naval Aviator, Corsair Fighter-Bomber Squadron VBF-82
 Kendall L. Card (B.E. 1977) – United States Navy Vice Admiral, 64th director of Naval Intelligence, Defense Superior Service Medal recipient
 Michael Bruce Colegrove (D.Phil.) – former colonel in the U.S. Army Reserve, 5th president of the Hargrave Military Academy
 Don Flickinger (M.D. 1934) – United States Air Force Brigadier General, aerospace medicine pioneer; commander, Air Force Office of Scientific Research, Distinguished Service Medal
 Evelyn Greenblatt Howren – pioneering female aviator, first class of Women Airforce Service Pilots in World War II
 Tramm Hudson (B.A. 1975) – United States Army Lieutenant Colonel, 3rd Infantry Division
 Claiborne H. Kinnard Jr. (B.E. 1937) – United States Army Air Force decorated World War II fighter ace, 355th Fighter Group, Distinguished Service Cross
 William J. Livsey (M.S. 1964) – United States Army Four-Star General, commander in chief of United Nations Command, Defense and Army Distinguished Service Medal recipient
 John Mazach (B.A. 1966) – United States Navy Vice Admiral, commander of the Naval Air Force Atlantic
 Barbara S. Pope (B.A. 1972) – United States Assistant Secretary of the Navy
 William Estel Potts (B.A. 1958) – United States Army Major General, Army Distinguished Service Medal, 22nd Chief of Ordnance for the U.S. Army Ordnance Corps, U.S. Army Ordnance Corps Hall of Fame
 Jack Reed (B.A. 1947) – United States Army, Signal Intelligence Service during World War II
 William "Rip" Robertson – United States Marine Corps Captain in the Pacific Theater, World War II, Paramilitary Operations Officer for the CIA's Special Activities Division, CIA Case Officer
 Maritza Sáenz Ryan (J.D. 1988) – United States Army Colonel, first female and Hispanic head of the department of law at the United States Military Academy
 Evander Shapard (LL.B 1917) – Royal Air Force World War I flying ace, 92 Squadron, six victories flying the S.E.5a, British Distinguished Flying Cross
 William Ruthven Smith – United States Army Major General, Superintendent of the United States Military Academy, Distinguished Service Medal recipient
 Nora W. Tyson (B.A. 1979) – United States Navy Vice Admiral, Legion of Merit, first woman to lead a U.S. Navy ship fleet 
 Volney F. Warner (M.A. 1959) – United States Army Four-Star General, Commander-in-Chief, United States Readiness Command (1979–1981), Defense Distinguished Service Medal recipient, coined the phrase "boots on the ground"

Ministry and religion 
 Arto Antturi – Finnish Lutheran priest, vicar for the parish of Pitäjänmäki
 T. C. Chao (M.A. 1916, B.D. 1917) – one of the leading Christian theological thinkers in China in the early twentieth century
 James L. Crenshaw (Ph.D. 1964) – Robert L. Flowers Professor of the Old Testament at Duke University, leading scholar in Old Testament Wisdom literature, Guggenheim Fellow
 Jane Dixon (B.A., M.A.T.) – Suffragan Bishop of the Episcopal Diocese of Washington, second female bishop of the Episcopal Church
 Musa Dube (Ph.D. 1997) – Botswana feminist theologian, 2011 Humboldt Prize winner
 Robert W. Estill (D.Min. 1980) – 9th bishop of the Episcopal Diocese of North Carolina
 Robert W. Funk (Ph.D. 1953) – American biblical scholar, founder of the Jesus Seminar and the nonprofit Westar Institute, Guggenheim Fellow, Fulbright Scholar
 William M. Greathouse – minister and emeritus general superintendent in the Church of the Nazarene
 William J. Hadden (M.Div. 1946) – Episcopal university chaplain, U.S. Army chaplain, U.S. Navy chaplain; desegregationist, World War II's V-12 Navy College Training Program at Vanderbilt
 Charles Robert Hager (M.D. 1894) – Swiss-American missionary, founder of the China Congregational Church in Hong Kong, baptized Sun Yat-sen, first president of the Republic of China
 John Wesley Hardt – bishop of the United Methodist Church, author, and biographer
 William S. Hatcher (B.A. 1957, M.A. 1958) – mathematician, philosopher; served on several National Spiritual Assemblies; wrote several books on the Baháʼí Faith after his 1957 conversion at Vanderbilt
 Susan Bunton Haynes (M.Div. 1993) – 11th Bishop of the Episcopal Diocese of Southern Virginia
 William G. Johnsson (Ph.D.) – Seventh-day Adventist author, former editor of the Adventist Review
 Yung Suk Kim (Ph.D. 2006) – Korean-American biblical scholar and author, editor of the Journal of Bible and Human Transformation and the Journal of Race, Ethnicity, and Religion
 Walter Russell Lambuth (M.D. 1877) – recipient of theology and medical degrees from Vanderbilt; Methodist missionary to China, Japan and Africa; later bishop of the Methodist Episcopal Church, South
 John H. Leith (M.A. 1946) – Presbyterian theologian and ordained minister, authored at 18 books on Christianity
 Tat-Siong Benny Liew (M.A. 1994, Ph.D. 1997) – 1956 chair of New Testament studies at the College of the Holy Cross
 Robert McIntyre – Scottish-born American Bishop of the Methodist Episcopal Church
 Mark A. Noll (Ph.D. 1975) – progressive evangelical scholar, historian at the University of Notre Dame
 Carroll D. Osburn (D.Div. 1970) – American scholar recognized as one of North America's leading New Testament textual critics and a prominent Christian egalitarian
 Mitch Pacwa  (Ph.D.) – bi-ritual American Jesuit priest celebrating liturgy in both the Roman and Maronite rites, president and founder of Ignatius Productions, accomplished linguist
 William Powlas Peery (M.A. 1959) – pastor of the Andhra Evangelical Lutheran Church in Andhra Pradesh, India, significant figure in South Indian Christianity in the 20th century
 David Penchansky (Ph.D. 1988) – scholar of the Hebrew Bible, literary critic to the Old Testament, particularly its Wisdom Literature
 Brant J. Pitre (M.T.S. 1999) – New Testament scholar, distinguished research professor of scripture at the Augustine Institute, Catholic transubstantiation theorist
 Clare Purcell (B.D. 1916) – American Methodist bishop
 Sidney Sanders (B.A. 1952) – 6th Bishop of the Episcopal Diocese of East Carolina
 Laurel C. Schneider (Ph.D. 1997) – professor of religious studies, religion and culture at the Vanderbilt Divinity School
 Timothy F. Sedgwick (M.A., Ph.D.) – American Episcopal ethicist
 Ken Stone (M.A. 1992, Ph.D. 1995) – author, chairman of the Reading, Theory and the Bible Section of the Society of Biblical Literature, Lambda Literary Award winner
 Thomas B. Warren (M.A., Ph.D.) – Restorationist philosopher and theologian
 B. Michael Watson (D.M) – bishop of The United Methodist Church
 Sharon D. Welch (Ph.D. 1982) – social ethicist and author; Affiliate Faculty, Meadville Lombard Theological School; former associate professor, Harvard Divinity School
 Walter Ziffer (B.E. 1954) – Czech-born Holocaust survivor, theologian, scholar, and author

Science, mathematics, and engineering 
 Mary Jo Baedecker (B.S. 1964) – geochemist, established the Toxic Substances Hydrology Program at the United States Geological Survey, Department of the Interior Distinguished Service Award, Meinzer Award
 Edward Emerson Barnard (B.A. 1887) – astronomer who discovered Barnard's star, Jupiter's fifth moon, nearly a dozen comets, and nebulous emissions in supernovae
 James L Barnard (Ph.D. 1971) – South African engineer, pioneer of biological nutrient remover, a non-chemical means of water treatment to remove nitrogen and phosphorus from used water
 Laura P. Bautz (B.S. 1961) – astronomer who created the Bautz–Morgan classification of galaxy clusters; professor, Northwestern University; director, astronomical science, National Science Foundation
 Bob Boniface (B.A. 1987) – automobile and industrial designer, director, Global Buick exterior design, director, Cadillac exterior design
 Sylvia Bozeman (M.S. 1970) – American mathematician whose research on functional analysis and image processing has been funded by the Army Research Office, National Science Foundation, and NASA
 Kimberly Bryant (B.E. 1989) – biotechnologist for Genentech, Novartis Vaccines, Diagnostics, and Merck, founder of Black Girls Code
 Charles R. Chappell (B.A. 1965) – NASA astronaut, former mission scientist for Spacelab 1, two-time NASA Exceptional Scientific Achievement Medal winner
 Yvonne Clark (M.S. 1972) – pioneer for African-American and women engineers, worked for NASA, Westinghouse, and Ford
 Baratunde A. Cola (B.E 2002, M.S. 2004) – scientist and engineer specializing in carbon nanotube technology, Alan T. Waterman Award winner
 Shirley Corriher (B.A. 1959) – biochemist and author
 William A. Davis Jr. (B.E. 1950) – engineer and distinguished leader in Ballistic Missile Defense (BMD) for the United States Army
 John H. DeWitt Jr. (B.E. 1928) – pioneer in radio broadcasting, radar astronomy and photometry, observed the first successful reception of radio echoes off the moon on January 10, 1946, as part of Project Diana
 Nathaniel Dean (Ph.D. 1987) – American mathematician who has made contributions to abstract and algorithmic graph theory, as well as data visualization and parallel computing
 Harry George Drickamer – pioneer experimentalist in high-pressure studies of condensed matter, 1974 Irving Langmuir Award, 1989 National Medal of Science
 Eric Eidsness (B.E. 1967) – engineer, EPA administrator, wrote the EPA's first environmental impact statement (EIS) established the EPA's water quality standards
 Jordan French (B.E. 2007) – engineer and 3D food printing pioneer, founding CMO of BeeHex, Inc.
 Fumiko Futamura (Ph.D. 2007) – mathematician known for her work on the mathematics of perspective, 2018 Carl B. Allendoerfer Award
 Kenneth Galloway (B.A. 1962) – American engineer researching solid-state devices, semiconductor technology, and radiation effects in electronics, IEEE Fellow
 Mai Gehrke (Postdoc) – Danish mathematician on the theory of lattices at the Centre national de la recherche scientifique (CNRS)
 Michael L. Gernhardt (B.S. 1978) – NASA astronaut and principal investigator of the Prebreathe Reduction Program at the Lyndon B. Johnson Space Center
 G. Scott Hubbard (B.S. 1970) – former director of NASA's Ames Research Center, chairman SpaceX Safety Advisory Panel, restructured the Mars program in the wake of mission failures
 Snehalata V. Huzurbazar (M.A. 1988) – American statistician, known for her work in statistical genetics, and applications of statistics to geology, Elected Fellow of the American Statistical Association
 Jedidah Isler – American astrophysicist, expert on blazars (supermassive black holes) and the astrophysical jet streams emanating from them
 Param Jaggi – American inventor, invented Algae Mobile, a device that converts  emitted from cars into oxygen, CEO of Hatch Technologies, founder and CEO of EcoViate, Forbes 30 Under 30
 Carl Jockusch (A&S 1959) – American mathematician who proved (with Robert I. Soare) the low basis theorem, with applications to recursion theory and reverse mathematics
 Steven E. Jones (Ph.D. 1978) – physicist, known for his long research on muon-catalyzed fusion and geo-fusion
 Michael Kearney (M.E. 2002) – youngest person in world history to attain a college degree, having done so at the age of ten; studied computer science at Vanderbilt
 Betty Klepper (B.A. 1958) – USDA scientist at Rhizotron, co-authored more than 200 scientific publications; first female editor, Crop Science; first female fellow, SSSA; first female president, CSSA
 Karen Kohanowich (B.S. 1982) – Undersea Technology Officer for the Office of Ocean Exploration and Research at the National Oceanic and Atmospheric Administration, aquanaut on the NASA Extreme Environment Mission Operations
 Duncan Leitch (B.S. 2006, Ph.D. 2013) – neurobiologist who gained recognition for his work on the integumentary sensory organs in crocodilians
 William R. Lucas (M.S., Ph.D.) – 4th director of the NASA Marshall Space Flight Center
 Ashwin Mahesh (M.S. 1993) – Indian urbanist, journalist, politician and social technologist, climate scientist at NASA
 Dennis Mammana (M.S.) – astronomy writer and sky photographer
 Jennifer R. Mandel (Ph.D. 2008) – plant biologist researching plant population, quantitative genetics, evolutionary genetics, and phylogenetics
 James Cullen Martin (M.S. 1952) – chemist, responsible for the hexafluorocumyl alcohol derived "Martin" bidentate ligand and a tridentate analog, co-invented the Dess–Martin periodinane, creator of the Martin sulfurane
 Emil Wolfgang Menzel Jr. (Ph.D. 1958) – primatologist whose research laid the foundation for the contemporary understanding of communication and cognition in chimpanzees
 Ronald E. Mickens (Ph.D. 1968) – American physicist specialized in nonlinear dynamics and mathematical modeling with significant contributions to the theory of nonlinear oscillations and numerical analysis
 James O. Mills (B.A. 1984) – archaeologist known for his work in paleopathology, excavations at Nekhen (Hierakonpolis), the capital of Upper Egypt in the late 4th millenniumBC, ancient Egypt's Protodynastic Period
 Stanford Moore (B.A. 1935) – protein chemist, inventor of a method for sequencing proteins, winner of the 1972 Nobel Prize in Chemistry
 Edward Craig Morris (B.A. 1961) – American archaeologist whose Inca expeditions created a modern understanding of the Inca civilization, chair of department of anthropology at the American Museum of Natural History
 Thiago David Olson (B.E. 2011) – electrical engineer and entrepreneur who created a homemade nuclear fusion reactor at age 17, electrical engineer at the U.S. Department of Defense, co-founder and CEO of Stratos Technologies, Inc.
 Mendel L. Peterson (M.A. 1940) – pioneer of underwater archeology and former curator at the Smithsonian Institution, known as "the father of underwater archeology;" namesake of Peterson Island in Antarctica
 Dorothy J. Phillips (B.A. 1967) – pioneering African-American chemist known for work on circular dichroism and bioseparation, director-at-Large of the American Chemical Society
 Polly Phipps (M.A.) – American social statistician, Senior Survey Methodologist at the US Bureau of Labor Statistics
 Philip Thomas Porter (B.A. 1952, M.A. 1953, Ph.D.) – electrical engineer and one of the guiding pioneers of the invention and development of early cellular telephone networks
 Joseph Melvin Reynolds (B.A. 1946) – physicist, first observation of Landau quantum oscillation in the Hall effect, first detection of LQO in Knight shift, NASA consultant, Guggenheim Fellow
 George G. Robertson – senior researcher, Visualization and Interaction Research Group, Microsoft Research
 Amy Rosemond (Ph.D. 1993) – aquatic ecosystem ecologist and biogeochemist who advanced the understanding of how nutrients affect energy flow in detritus-based food webs, Ecological Society of America Fellow
 J. Robert Sims (B.S. 1963) – American chemical, mechanical engineer, former research engineer at ExxonMobil, inventor, former president of the American Society of Mechanical Engineers
 Ruth Stokes (M.A. 1923) – American mathematician, cryptologist, and astronomer who made pioneering contributions to the theory of linear programming; founder of Pi Mu Epsilon
 John Ridley Stroop (B.S. 1924, M.A. 1925, Ph.D. 1933) – psychologist known for discovering the Stroop effect, a psychological process related to word recognition, color and interference
 James R. Thompson (B.S. 1960) – American statistician known for biomathematically modeling HIV, AIDS, and cancer
 Bruce J. Tromberg (B.A. 1979) – American photochemist and a leading researcher in the field of biophotonics
 Douglas Vakoch – American astrobiologist, search for extraterrestrial intelligence (SETI) researcher, president of METI (Messaging Extraterrestrial Intelligence)
 Davita Watkins (B.S. 2006) – American chemist developing supramolecular synthesis methods to make new organic semiconducting materials for applications in optoelectronic devices
 Marsha Rhea Williams (Ph.D. 1982) – first African-American woman to earn a computer science Ph.D., National Science Foundation fellow

Medicine 
 Alejandro Sánchez Alvarado (B.S. 1986) – Venezuelan molecular biologist and an investigator of the Howard Hughes Medical Institute
 Jean R. Anderson (M.D.) – internationally recognized obstetrician and gynaecologist, founder and first director of the Johns Hopkins Hospital HIV Women's Health Program (1991)
 Humphrey Bate (M.D. 1898) – American physician and musician who served as a surgeon in the Spanish–American War (1898)
 Eugene Lindsay Bishop (M.D. 1914) – director of health and safety, TVA, whose studies and control programs for malaria earned him a Lasker Award (1950)
 Daniel Blain (M.D. 1929) – first medical director of the American Psychiatric Association (APA)
 Ogden Bruton (M.D. 1933) – made significant advances in immunology,<ref>Biography of Ogden Carr Bruton, National Library of Medicine Ogden C. Bruton Papers 1925-1994</</ref> discovered Bruton-type agammaglobulinemia, namesake of Bruton's tyrosine kinase
 Thomas C. Butler (M.D. 1967) – American scientist specializing in infectious diseases including cholera and bubonic plague, credited with making oral hydration the standard treatment for diarrhea
 David Charles (B.S. 1986, M.D. 1990) – neurologist, chief medical officer of the Vanderbilt Neuroscience Institute, director of telemedicine at Vanderbilt University Medical Center
 Alice Drew Chenoweth (M.D. 1932) – physician who specialized in pediatrics and public health, served as the chief of the Division of Health Services in the United States Children's Bureau
 Robert D. Collins (B.A. 1948, M.D. 1951) – American physician and pathologist who established the Lukes–Collins scheme for pathologic classification of lymphoma
 Judith A. Cooper (M.S. 1972) – former director of the National Institute on Deafness and Other Communication Disorders
 Katherine Cullen (Ph.D. 1995) – American biologist whose work provided direct evidence that the larger three-dimensional structure of the genome is related to its function
 Juliet Daniel (Postdoc) – Canadian cancer biologist, discovered and named the protein ZBTB33 "Kaiso" at Vanderbilt in 1996
 William H. Dobelle – biomedical researcher and artificial vision pioneer, nominated for the Nobel Prize in Physiology or Medicine in 2003
 Allan L. Drash (B.A. 1953) – pediatric endocrinologist, former president of the American Diabetes Association, one of the original describers of the Denys–Drash syndrome
 Wilton R. Earle (Ph.D. 1928) – American cell biologist known for his research in cell culture techniques and carcinogenesis
 Arnold Eskin (B.S) – leader in the discovery of mechanisms underlying entrainment of circadian clocks, developed the heuristic Eskinogram
 Francis M. Fesmire (M.D. 1985) – emergency physician and nationally recognized expert in myocardial infarction
 J. Donald M. Gass (B.A. 1950, M.D. 1957) – Canadian-American ophthalmologist, one of the world's leading specialists on diseases of the retina, first to describe many macular diseases
 Ernest William Goodpasture (B.A. 1908) – American pathologist who invented methods for growing viruses and rickettsiae in fertilized chicken eggs, enabling the development of vaccination, described Goodpasture syndrome
 Barney S. Graham (Ph.D. 1991) – chief, Viral Pathogenesis Lab, Vaccine Research Center; co-designed spike protein with Moderna for the COVID-19 vaccine
 James Tayloe Gwathmey (M.D. 1899) – physician and pioneer of early anesthetic devices for medical use, hailed as the "Father of Modern Anesthesia"
 Tinsley R. Harrison – American physician and creator and editor of the first five editions of internal medicine textbook Harrison's Principles of Internal Medicine
 Tina Hartert (M.D., M.P.H) –  Lulu H. Owen Endowed Chair in Medicine, Vanderbilt University; leader, Human Epidemiology and Response to SARS (HEROS) study, National Institutes of Health
 Richard Hatchett (B.A. 1989, M.D. 1995) – CEO of Coalition for Epidemic Preparedness Innovations, Secretary of Health and Human Services Distinguished Service Award
 Dorothy E. Johnson (B.S. 1942) – nursing theorist, created the Behavioral System Model, a founder of modern system-based nursing theory
 Robb Krumlauf (B.E. 1970) – American developmental biologist best known for his progression of the understanding of Hox genes
 Zenas Sanford Loftis (B.S. 1901) – physician, medical missionary to Tibet
 Louis Lowenstein (B.A., M.D.) – medical researcher who made significant contributions in hematology and immunology
 Tom Maniatis (Ph.D.) – professor of molecular and cellular biology known for the development and application of gene cloning methods to the study of molecular biology
 John Owsley Manier (B.A. 1907) – American physician, accompanied the Vanderbilt hospital unit to Fort McPherson in 1917
 G. Patrick Maxwell (M.D.) – plastic surgeon, first successful microsurgical transfer of the latissimus muscle flap at Johns Hopkins University, advanced the design of tissue expanders
 H. Houston Merritt (B.S. 1922) – pioneering neurologist who discovered the anticonvulsant properties of phenytoin (Dilantin), which ushered in the modern era of drug therapy for epilepsy
 Hugh Jackson Morgan (B.A. 1914) – former chair the department of medicine at Vanderbilt, former president of the American College of Physicians
 Harold L. Moses (M.D. 1962) – Ingram Professor of Cancer Research, professor of cancer biology, medicine and pathology, and director emeritus at the Vanderbilt-Ingram Cancer Center, president of the American Association for Cancer Research (1991)
 Sharlene Newman (B.E. 1993) – pioneered use of neuroimaging and functional magnetic resonance imaging to study language processing in the human brain
 George C. Nichopoulos (M.D. 1959) – American physician best known as Elvis Presley's personal physician
 Jodi Nunnari (Ph.D.) – cell biologist and pioneer in the field of mitochondrial biology, editor-in-chief The Journal of Cell Biology, president-elect of the American Society for Cell Biology
 Lacy Overby (B.A. 1941, M.S. 1945, Ph.D. 1951) – virologist known for his contributions to Hepatitis B and Hepatitis C research
 William A. Pusey (B.A. 1885) – American physician and past president of the American Medical Association, expert in the study of syphilis, authored the first history of dermatology in English
 Sanford Rosenthal (M.D. 1920) – pioneered liver function tests, discovered rongalite as the antidote for mercury poisoning, discovered an antibiotic cure for pneumococcal pneumonia, Public Health Service Meritorious Service Medal (1962)
 Samuel Santoro (M.D./Ph.D. 1979) – pioneering researcher in the structure of integrin adhesive receptors for extracellular matrix proteins, chair of the Department of Pathology, Microbiology and Immunology at Vanderbilt
 Robert Taylor Segraves (B.A. 1963, M.D. 1971) – American psychiatrist best known for his work on sexual dysfunction and its pharmacologic causes and treatments
 Karen Seibert (Ph.D.) – pharmacological scientist, discoverer of celecoxib, instrumental in the elaboration of the COX-2 inflammatory pathway
 Hrayr Shahinian – American skull base surgeon and founder of the Skull Base Institute (SBI)
 Norman Shumway (M.D. 1949) – 67th president of the American Association for Thoracic Surgery and the first to perform a successful heart transplant in the United States
 John Abner Snell (M.D. 1908) – missionary surgeon and hospital administrator in Suzhou (Soochow), China
 Sophie Spitz (M.D. 1932) – pathologist who published the first case series of a special form of benign melanocytic nevi that have come to be known as Spitz nevi
 Mildred T. Stahlman (B.A. 1943, M.D. 1946) – professor of pediatrics and pathology at Vanderbilt, started the first newborn intensive care unit in the world, winner of the John Howland Award
 Ghanshyam Swarup – Indian molecular biologist known for his studies on glaucoma and the discovery of protein tyrosine phosphatase, Shanti Swaroop Bhatnagar laureate
 Carol Tamminga (M.D. 1971) –  American psychiatrist and neuroscientist focusing in schizophrenia, psychotic bipolar disorder, and schizoaffective disorder, National Academy of Medicine fellow
 Robert V. Tauxe (M.D.) – director of the Division of Foodborne, Waterborne and Environmental Diseases of the Centers for Disease Control and Prevention
 James C. Tsai (M.B.A. 1998) – president, New York Eye and Ear Infirmary of Mount Sinai, system chair of the Department of Ophthalmology at the Mount Sinai Health System
 Krystal Tsosie (MPH, Ph.D.) – American geneticist and bioethicist known for promoting Indigenous data sovereignty and studying genetics within Indigenous communities
 Rhonda Voskuhl (M.D.) – physician and research scientist, Brain Research Institute (BRI) at the David Geffen School of Medicine at UCLA, principal investigator for treatment trials for multiple sclerosis (MS)
 Peter Walter (M.S. 1977) – German-American molecular biologist and biochemist known for work on unfolded protein response and the signal recognition particle, 2014 Lasker Award, 2018 Breakthrough Prize in Life Sciences winner
 Levi Watkins (M.D. 1970) – heart surgeon and civil rights activist; first to successfully implant an automatic defibrillator in a human patient with surgical technologist Vivien Thomas
 Logan Wright (Ph.D. 1964) – American pediatric psychologist, former president of the American Psychological Association, coined the term pediatric psychology
 Li Yang (Ph.D.) – American biologist, senior investigator and head of the tumor microenvironment section at the National Cancer Institute
 Lynn Zechiedrich (Ph.D. 1990) – American biochemist, developed novel approaches to characterize the topography of DNA, National Academy of Inventors (2017)

Notable faculty and staff 
 Virginia Abernethy, professor emerita of psychiatry and anthropology; population expert; immigration reduction advocate
 Douglas Adams, distinguished professor of civil and environmental engineering
 Akram Aldroubi, professor of mathematics and Fellow of the American Mathematical Society
 Sidney Altman, Canadian-American molecular biologist, former researcher in molecular biology at Vanderbilt, 1989 Nobel Prize in Chemistry winner
 Igor Ansoff, Russian-American applied mathematician, known as the father of strategic management
 Celia Applegate, American scholar, William R. Kenan, Jr. Professor of History, Affiliate Faculty of Musicology and Ethnomusicology
 Richard Arenstorf, American mathematician, discovered a stable orbit between the Earth and the Moon (Arenstorf Orbit), which was the basis of the orbit used by the Apollo Program for going to the Moon
 Jeremy Atack, research professor emeritus of economics
 Nils Aall Barricelli, Norwegian-Italian mathematician whose early computer-assisted experiments in symbiogenesis and evolution are considered pioneering in artificial life research
 Larry Bartels, American political scientist, co-director of the Center for the Study of Democratic Institutions and Shayne Chair in Public Policy and Social Science
 Eugene Biel-Bienne, Austrian painter, former faculty of the department of fine arts in the College of Arts and Science
 Camilla Benbow, dean of Peabody College at Vanderbilt University, scholar on education of gifted youth
 John Keith Benton (1896–1956), dean of the Vanderbilt University Divinity School, 1939–1956
 Lauren Benton, historian known for works on the history of empires, Nelson O. Tyrone, Jr. Professor of History and professor of law
 Michael Bess, Chancellor's Professor of History, professor of European studies
 David Blackbourn, British historian, Cornelius Vanderbilt Distinguished Chair of History
 Alfred Blalock, professor of surgery; in the 1930s did pioneering research on traumatic shock
 Paolo Boffetta, Italian epidemiologist
 John D. Boice Jr., professor of medicine at Vanderbilt University School of Medicine whose discoveries "have been used to formulate public health measures to reduce population exposure to radiation and prevent radiation-associated diseases"
 Eric Bond, economist, Joe L. Roby Professor of Economics
 William James Booth, professor of political science, professor of philosophy
 Constance Bumgarner Gee, art policy scholar, memoirist
 George Arthur Buttrick, Christian scholar
 Brandon R. Byrd, scholar of African American history
 William Caferro, Gertrude Conaway Vanderbilt Professor of History, 2010 John Simon Guggenheim Memorial Foundation Fellow
 John Tyler Caldwell (1911–1991), professor of political science at Vanderbilt University, 1939–1947; chancellor of North Carolina State University 1959–1975
 Joy H. Calico, Cornelius Vanderbilt Professor of Musicology at the Blair School of Music, Berlin Prize Winner (2005)
 Kenneth C. Catania, neurobiologist, Stevenson Professor of Biological Sciences, MacArthur Fellow (2006)
 Jay Clayton, literary critic, William R. Kenan, Jr. Professor of English and director of the Curb Center for Art, Enterprise, and Public Policy
 Jeff Coffin, Grammy Award winning saxophonist, member of Dave Matthews Band and Béla Fleck and the Flecktones, faculty of the Blair School of Music
 Stanley Cohen, biochemist, discoverer of cellular growth factors, winner of the 1986 Nobel Prize in Physiology or Medicine
 Alain Connes, mathematician, Fields Medal Winner (1982)
 James C. Conwell, mechanical engineer, president of Rose-Hulman Institute of Technology
 Bruce Cooil, Dean Samuel B. and Evelyn R. Richmond Professor of Management at Vanderbilt University in the Owen Graduate School of Management
 Tim Corbin, head coach, Vanderbilt Commodores Men's Baseball (2003–present). Led Commodores to 2014 National Championship
 Margaret Cuninggim, dean of women, 1966–1973; namesake of the Margaret Cuninggim Women's Center on campus
 Walter Clyde Curry, American academic, medievalist and poet, member of Fugitives, joined the English department in 1915, chair of the English department (1941–1955)
 J. Dewey Daane, American economist and the Frank K. Houston Professor of Finance, emeritus and senior advisor, Financial Markets Research Center at Vanderbilt University, Board of Governors of the Federal Reserve
 Richard L. Daft, sociologist
 Larry Dalton, American chemist best known for his work in polymeric nonlinear electro-optics, introduced the concept of Saturation Transfer Spectroscopy while at Vanderbilt
 Kate Daniels, American poet
 Donald Davie, British Movement poet and literary critic, author of Purity of Diction in English Verse, Vanderbilt professor (1978–1988)
 Colin Dayan, Robert Penn Warren Professor in the Humanities
 Max Delbrück, pioneering molecular biologist, winner of the 1969 Nobel Prize in Physiology or Medicine
 Arthur Demarest, Ingram Professor of Anthropology, Mesoamerican scholar
 Collins Denny (1854–1943), professor of philosophy at Vanderbilt until 1911; taught John Crowe Ransom; tried to "impose theological control over the university" when he became bishop of the Methodist Episcopal Church, South
 Jacob M. Dickinson, professor of law from 1897 to 1899 while he was an attorney for the Louisville and Nashville Railroad; United States Secretary of War, 1909–1911
 Tom Dillehay, American anthropologist, Rebecca Webb Wilson University Distinguished Professor of Anthropology, Religion, and Culture
 Tony Earley, novelist
 Jesse Ehrenfeld, professor of anesthesiology, surgery, biomedical informatics, and health policy, chair-elect of the American Medical Association, leading researcher in the field of biomedical informatics
 Mark Ellingham, professor of mathematics, discoverer and namesake of the Ellingham–Horton graphs, two cubic 3-vertex-connected bipartite graphs that have no Hamiltonian cycle.
 James W. Ely Jr., Milton R. Underwood Professor of Law emeritus and professor of history emeritus, recipient of the Brigham-Kanner Property Rights Prize
 Leonard Feldman, American physicist, named Fellow of the Institute of Electrical and Electronics Engineers (IEEE) in 2016 for contributions to semiconductor-dielectric interfaces for MOS technologies.
 Charlotte Froese Fischer, chemist and mathematician responsible for the development of the multi-configurational self-consistent field of computational chemistry
 Edward F. Fischer, professor of anthropology
 Daniel M. Fleetwood, Olin H. Landreth Chair of the Electrical Engineering, co-invented a memory chip based on mobile protons, one of the top 250 most highly cited researchers in engineering, Chess Grandmaster
 Walter Lynwood Fleming, American historian of the South and Reconstruction, dean of the Vanderbilt College of Arts and Sciences in 1923 and later director of the graduate school, supporter of the Southern Agrarians
 Jim Foglesong, member of the Country Music Hall of Fame
 Hezekiah William Foote, co-founder and Vanderbilt trustee; Confederate veteran, attorney, planter and state politician from Mississippi; great-grandfather of Civil War author Shelby Foote
 Harold Ford, Jr., former U.S. Congressman, candidate for Senate
 William Franke, American academic and philosopher, professor of Comparative Literature
 Marilyn Friedman, American philosopher, W. Alton Jones Chair of Philosophy
 Bill Frist, Majority Leader (2002–2007); U.S. Senate (1995–2007); former transplant surgeon
 F. Drew Gaffney, NASA astronaut, Payload Specialist for the STS-40 Space Life Sciences (SLS 1) Space Shuttle mission, professor of medicine
 Sidney Clarence Garrison (1885–1945), 2nd president of Peabody College (now part of Vanderbilt University), 1938–1945
 Nicholas Georgescu-Roegen, Romanian American mathematician, statistician and economist, distinguished professor of economics, emeritus (1949–1976), progenitor and a paradigm founder in economics, his work was seminal in establishing ecological economics
 Sam B. Girgus, author, film and literature scholar
 Ellen Goldring, education scholar
 Ernest William Goodpasture, pioneering virologist; invented the method of growing viruses in fertile chickens' eggs
 George J. Graham Jr., political theorist who trained generations of political scientists at Vanderbilt, Fulbright scholar, Guggenheim Fellow
 Alexander Little Page Green, Methodist minister; a founder of Vanderbilt; his portrait hangs in the Board of Trust lounge of Kirkland Hall on the Vanderbilt campus
 Paul Greengard, visiting scholar, neuroscientist known for his work on molecular and cellular function of neurons, 2000 Nobel Prize for Physiology or Medicine
 F. Peter Guengerich, professor of biochemistry and the director of the Center in Molecular Toxicology, William C. Rose Award winner
 Peter Guralnick, music critic and historian; author; screenwriter
 Osamu Hayaishi, prominent Japanese biochemist, discovered oxygenases in 1955
 Carolyn Heinrich, economics professor and currently concurrently Sid Richardson Professor at University of Texas at Austin
 Suzana Herculano-Houzel, Brazilian neuroscientist working in comparative neuroanatomy; invented method of counting of neurons of the brain, discovered the relation between the cerebral cortex area and thickness and number of cortical folds
 Nicholas Hobbs, provost (1967–1975); former president of the American Psychological Association
 Elijah Embree Hoss, chair of ecclesiastical history, church polity and pastoral theology (1885–90); later a bishop of the Methodist Episcopal Church, South
 Milton W. Humphreys, Confederate sergeant during the Civil War, first professor of Latin and Greek at Vanderbilt, president of the American Philological Association (1882–1883)
 Dawn Iacobucci, quantitative psychologist and marketing researcher, professor in marketing at the Owen Graduate School of Management
 Bill Ivey, director of the National Endowment for the Arts during the Clinton administration; director of the Curb Center at Vanderbilt
 Kevin Jackson, British writer, broadcaster, filmmaker and pataphysician, former professor of English, regular BBC contributor, Fellow of the Royal Society of Arts, Companion of the Guild of St George
 Mark Jarman, poet and critic often identified with the New Narrative branch of New Formalism
 Carl H. Johnson, American biologist, Stevenson Professor of Biological Sciences, professor of biological sciences, professor of molecular physiology and biophysics
 Sir Vaughan Jones, Stevenson Distinguished Professor of Mathematics, Fields Medal winner (1990)
 Bjarni Jónsson, Icelandic mathematician and logician, emeritus distinguished professor of mathematics, namesake of Jónsson algebras, ω-Jónsson functions, Jónsson cardinals, and Jónsson terms
 Edward Southey Joynes, first professor of modern languages at Vanderbilt
 Peter Kolkay, associate professor of bassoon at the Blair School of Music, 2004 Avery Fisher Career Grant, First Prize at the Concert Artists Guild International Competition
 John Lachs, philosopher and pragmatist
 Paul C. H. Lim, Vanderbilt University Divinity School professor, scholar on Reformation and post-Reformation England
 David Lubinski, psychology professor known for his work in applied research, psychometrics, and individual differences
 Nathaniel Thomas Lupton, professor of chemistry at Vanderbilt (1875–1885)
 Horace Harmon Lurton, Associate Justice of the Supreme Court of the United States (1909–1914), former dean of Vanderbilt Law School
 Ian Macara, British-American biologist researching the molecules that establish Cell polarity in Epithelium, both in normal cells and in cancer, currently the Louise B. McGavock Chair at Vanderbilt
 Anita Mahadevan-Jansen, Orrin H. Ingram Chair in Biomedical Engineering
 Thomas H. Malone (1834–1906), Confederate veteran; judge; dean of the Vanderbilt University Law School for two decades
 David Maraniss, biographer, columnist for the Washington Post and distinguished visiting professor of political science. His articles on President Bill Clinton would win the Pulitzer Prize for National Reporting in 1993.
 Jesse W. Markham, American economist best known for his work on antitrust policy, price theory and industrial organization, former chief economist to the Federal Trade Commission, associate professor (1948–1952)
 Richard C. McCarty, professor of psychology and provost of Vanderbilt University
 Ralph McKenzie, American mathematician, logician, and abstract algebraist.
 Douglas G. McMahon, professor of biological sciences and pharmacology, known for discoveries in the fields of chronobiology and vision
 Jon Meacham, visiting distinguished professor of political science, former executive vice president of Random House, and presidential biographer
 Michael Menaker, former chair of the Pharmacology Department, influential researcher on circadian rhythmicity of vertebrates
 Glenn Allan Millikan, former head of the department of physiology at the School of Medicine, introduced oximetry into physiology and clinical medicine, invented the first practical, portable pulse oximeter
 Jason H. Moore, translational bioinformatics scientist, founding director of the Advanced Computing Center for Research and Education at Vanderbilt (2000–2004)
 Lorrie Moore, fiction writer, Gertrude Conaway Vanderbilt Professor of English
 Gisela Mosig, German-American molecular biologist best known for her work with enterobacteria phage T4, among the first to recognize the importance of recombination intermediates in establishing new DNA replication forks
 Roy Neel, campaign manager for Howard Dean; deputy chief of staff for Bill Clinton and chief of staff for Al Gore
 Herman Clarence Nixon, professor, member of the Southern Agrarians
 Thomas Nyfenger, principal flutist of the Mostly Mozart Festival Orchestra and the New York Chamber Symphony, former associate professor of flute at the Blair School of Music
 Kelly Oliver, American philosopher specializing in feminism, political philosophy and ethics, W. Alton Jones Professor of Philosophy, founder of the feminist philosophy journal philoSOPHIA.
 Aleksandr Olshansky, Soviet and Russian mathematician working in combinatorial and geometric group theory, professor of mathematics, Maltsev Prize laureate
 Frank Lawrence Owsley, American historian
 Sokrates Pantelides, university distinguished professor of physics and engineering, William and Nancy McMinn Professor of Physics
 Lyman Ray Patterson, influential copyright scholar and historian, former Vanderbilt University Law School professor, served as an assistant United States Attorney while teaching at Vanderbilt
 Bruce Ryburn Payne (1874–1937), founding president of Peabody College (now part of Vanderbilt University), 1911–1937
 Michael D. Plummer, retired professor of mathematics, known for his contributions to graph theory
 Ambra A. Pozzi, professor of nephrology working on matrix biology and matrix receptor biology
 Michael Alec Rose, composer, author, and professor of music composition at Vanderbilt's Blair School of Music
 Edward B. Saff, American mathematician, specializing in complex analysis, approximation theory, numerical analysis, and potential theory, Guggenheim Fellow
 Herbert Charles Sanborn (1873–1967), chair of the department of philosophy and psychology at Vanderbilt University 1921–1942
 Samuel Santoro, Dorothy B. and Theodore R. Austin Professor and chair at Vanderbilt University, microbiologist and immunologist researching structure and biology of integrin adhesive receptors for extracellular matrix proteins
 Mark Sapir, Russian-American mathematician working in geometric group theory, semigroup theory and combinatorial algebra, Centennial Professor of Mathematics
 Charles Madison Sarratt (1888–1978), chair of the department of mathematics at Vanderbilt University, 1924–1946; dean of students, 1939–1945; vice-chancellor, 1946–1958; dean of alumni, 1958–1978
 Thomas Alan Schwartz, historian of American foreign relations, former president of the Society for Historians of American Foreign Relations
 Julia Sears, mathematician, pioneering feminist
 Margaret Rhea Seddon, astronaut
 Douglas C. Schmidt, computer scientist
 Ronald D. Schrimpf, electrical engineer and scientist, Orrin H. Ingram Chair in Engineering, Electrical Engineering & Computer Science, director of the Institute for Space and Defense Electronics at Vanderbilt
 Choon-Leong Seow, Singaporean biblical scholar, semitist, epigrapher, and historian of Near Eastern religion, currently as Vanderbilt, Buffington, Cupples Chair in Divinity and distinguished professor of Hebrew Bible
 Carl Keenan Seyfert, American astronomer, known for research on high-excitation line emission from the centers of some spiral galaxies named Seyfert galaxies, first director of Vanderbilt's Dyer Observatory
 Albert Micajah Shipp, professor of exegetical theology at Vanderbilt University in 1875; dean of the Divinity School, 1882–1887
 Steve Simpson, research professor of mathematics, known for reverse mathematics
 Ganesh Sitaraman, American legal scholar, professor of law, adviser to Elizabeth Warren, senior fellow of the Center for American Progress
 Francis G. Slack, professor of physics and head of the department of physics (appointed 1939), instrumental in the discovery of nuclear fission
 William Oscar Smith, jazz double bassist; founder of the W.O. Smith Music School in Nashville; former professor at Vanderbilt's Blair School of Music
 Larry Soderquist, professor of law at Vanderbilt University Law School (1981–2005), director at Corporate and Securities Law Institute
 Ronald Spores, archaeologist, ethnohistorian and Mesoamerican scholar
 Hans Stoll, his research revolutionized the field of financial derivatives and market microstructure
 Thomas Osgood Summers, Methodist theologian; dean of the Biblical Department at Vanderbilt in 1878
 Earl Sutherland, physiologist; discoverer of hormonal second messengers; winner of the 1971 Nobel Prize in Physiology or Medicine
 Carol Miller Swain, professor of Political Science and Law
 Kent Syverud, former Garner Anthony Professor of Law at the Vanderbilt University Law School, expert on complex litigation, insurance law, and civil procedure
 Janos Sztipanovits, computer scientist, led the research group that created a novel area in computer engineering called Model Integrated Computing (MIC)
 Robert B. Talisse, American philosopher and political theorist, former editor of Public Affairs Quarterly
 Dean S. Tarbell, former distinguished professor of chemistry known for his development of detection methods of chemical warfare agents during World War II, and his discovery of mixed carboxylic-carbonic anhydrides
 Vivian Thomas, surgical technician working with Alfred Blalock; developed techniques that enabled key advances in the treatment of traumatic shock
 Wilbur Fisk Tillett (1854–1936), professor of theology, dean of the Theological Faculty after 1884 and vice-chancellor after 1886
 Norman Tolk, American physicist
 Barbara Tsakirgis, American classical archaeologist with specialization in Greek and Roman archaeology
 Kalman Varga, Hungarian-American physicist, Fellow of the American Physical Society.
 William J. Vaughn (1834–1912), professor of mathematics; librarian
 Jerzy Vetulani, Polish neuroscientist, pharmacologist and biochemist, former research professor, discovered β-downregulation by chronic administration of antidepressants
 W. Kip Viscusi, American economist, university distinguished professor of law, economics, and management at Vanderbilt University Law School
 John Donald Wade, member of English faculty, contributed to Southern Agrarian manifesto I'll Take My Stand
 Taylor Wang, first Taiwanese person of Han Chinese ancestry to go into space, employee of the Jet Propulsion Laboratory, payload specialist on the Space Shuttle Challenger mission STS-51-B
 John Wikswo, biological physicist, Gordon A. Cain University Professor, professor of biomedical engineering, professor of molecular physiology and biophysics, director, Vanderbilt Institute for Integrative Biosystems Research and Education, A.B. Learned Professor in Living State Physics
 Consuelo H. Wilkins, physician, researcher, academic and administrator, Vanderbilt University School of Medicine
 Arthur Frank Witulski, research associate professor electrical engineering and computer science, engineer at the Institute for Space and Defense Electronics at Vanderbilt
 David Wood, British philosopher
 Daoxing Xia, Chinese American mathematician, currently a professor in the department of mathematics, elected an academician of the Chinese Academy of Science in 1980
 Christopher Yoo, professor at Vanderbilt University Law School (1999–2007), former director of Vanderbilt's Technology and Entertainment Law Program, among the most frequently cited scholars of technology law, media law and copyright
 Guoliang Yu, Chinese American mathematician best known for his fundamental contributions to the Novikov conjecture on homotopy invariants of higher signatures, professor of mathematics (2000–2012)
 Serge Aleksandrovich Zenkovsky, Russian historian, specialized in economic history in Eastern Europe and Central Asia, Guggenheim Fellow
 Mel Ziegler, American artist specialized in community art, integrated arts, public art, current chair of the Department of Art

Gallery of Vanderbilt notables

References

Lists of people by university or college in Tennessee